= Jean-Auguste-Dominique Ingres =

French painter (1780–1867)

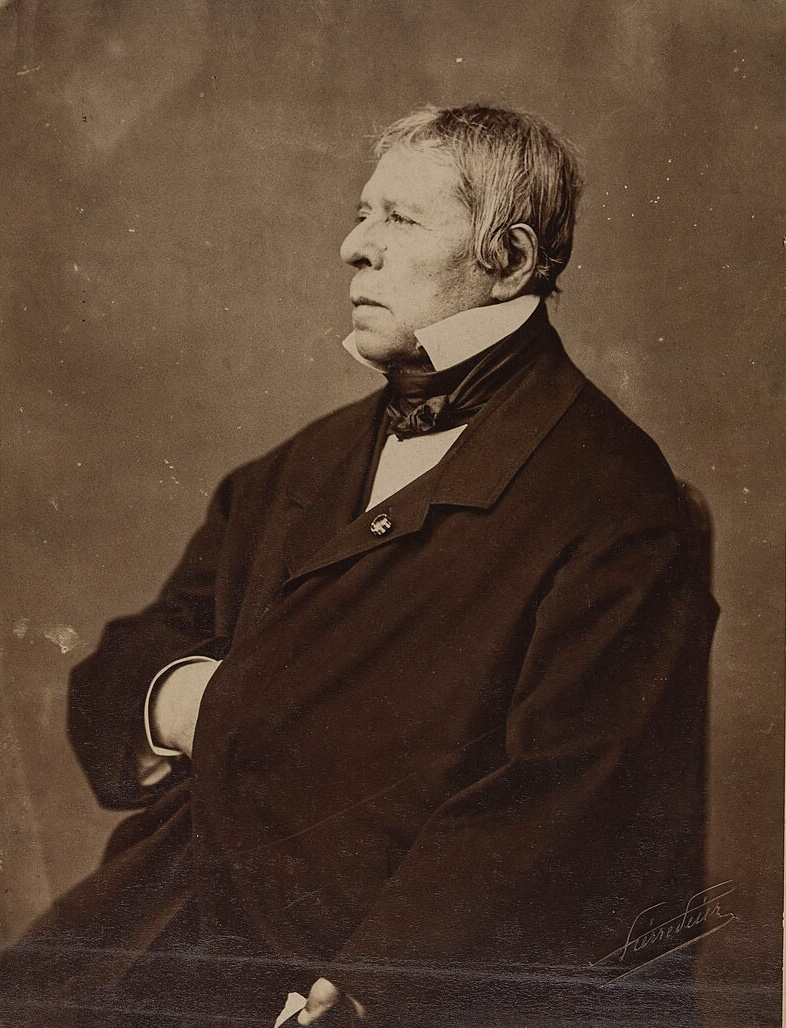
- Ingres in c. 1850–1867
- Born: Jean-Auguste-Dominique Ingres; 29 August 1780; Montauban, Quercy, Kingdom of France
- Died: 14 January 1867 (aged 86); Paris, France
- Known for: Painting; drawing
- Notable work: Napoleon I on His Imperial Throne (1806); Grande Odalisque (1814); Oedipus and the Sphinx (1827); Portrait of Monsieur Bertin (1832); The Turkish Bath (1863)
- Movement: Neoclassicism; Orientalism; Romanticism
- Spouse(s): Madeleine Chapelle (m. 1813; died 1849) Delphine Ramel (m. 1852–1867)

Signature
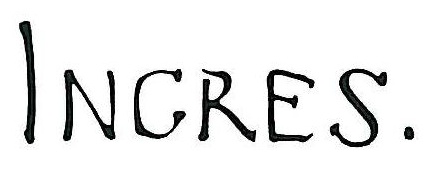

Jean-Auguste-Dominique Ingres (/ˈæŋɡrə/ ANG-grə; French: [ʒɑ̃ oɡyst dɔminik ɛ̃ɡʁ]; 29 August 1780 – 14 January 1867) was a French Neoclassical painter. Ingres was profoundly influenced by past artistic traditions and aspired to become the guardian of academic orthodoxy against the ascendant Romantic style. Although he considered himself a painter of history in the tradition of Nicolas Poussin and Jacques-Louis David, it is his portraits, both painted and drawn, that are recognized as his greatest legacy. His expressive distortions of form and space made him an important precursor of modern art, influencing Henri Matisse, Pablo Picasso, and other modernists.

Born into a modest family in Montauban, he travelled to Paris to study in the studio of David. In 1802 he made his Salon debut, and won the Prix de Rome for his painting The Ambassadors of Agamemnon in the tent of Achilles. By the time he departed in 1806 for his residency in Rome, his style—revealing his close study of Italian and Flemish Renaissance masters—was fully developed, and would change little for the rest of his life. While working in Rome and subsequently Florence from 1806 to 1824, he regularly sent paintings to the Paris Salon, where they were faulted by critics who found his style bizarre and archaic. He received few commissions during this period for the history paintings he aspired to paint, but was able to support himself and his wife as a portrait painter and draughtsman.

He was finally recognized at the Salon in 1824, when his Raphaelesque painting, The Vow of Louis XIII, was met with acclaim, and Ingres was acknowledged as the leader of the Neoclassical school in France. Although the income from commissions for history paintings allowed him to paint fewer portraits, his Portrait of Monsieur Bertin marked his next popular success in 1833. The following year, his indignation at the harsh criticism of his ambitious composition The Martyrdom of Saint Symphorian caused him to return to Italy, where he assumed directorship of the French Academy in Rome in 1835. He returned to Paris for good in 1841. In his later years he painted new versions of many of his earlier compositions, a series of designs for stained glass windows, several important portraits of women, and The Turkish Bath, the last of his several Orientalist paintings of the female nude, which he finished at the age of 83.

== Early years: Montauban and Toulouse ==
Ingres was born in Montauban, Tarn-et-Garonne, France, the first of seven children (five of whom survived infancy) of Jean-Marie-Joseph Ingres (1755–1814) and his wife Anne Moulet (1758–1817). His father was a successful jack-of-all-trades in the arts, a painter of miniatures, sculptor, decorative stonemason, and amateur musician; his mother was the nearly illiterate daughter of a master wigmaker. From his father the young Ingres received early encouragement and instruction in drawing and music, and his first known drawing, a study after an antique cast, was made in 1789. Starting in 1786, he attended the local school École des Frères de l'Éducation Chrétienne, but his education was disrupted by the turmoil of the French Revolution, and the closing of the school in 1791 marked the end of his conventional education. The deficiency in his schooling would always remain for him a source of insecurity.

In 1791, Joseph Ingres took his son to Toulouse, where the young Jean-Auguste-Dominique was enrolled in the Académie Royale de Peinture, Sculpture et Architecture. There he studied under the sculptor Jean-Pierre Vigan, the landscape painter Jean Briant, and the neoclassical painter Guillaume-Joseph Roques. Roques' veneration of Raphael was a decisive influence on the young artist. Ingres won prizes in several disciplines, such as composition, "figure and antique", and life studies. His musical talent was developed under the tutelage of the violinist Lejeune, and from the ages of thirteen to sixteen he played second violin in the Orchestre du Capitole de Toulouse.

From an early age he was determined to be a history painter, which, in the hierarchy of genres established by the Royal Academy of Painting and Sculpture under Louis XIV, and continued well into the 19th Century, was considered the highest level of painting. He did not want to simply make portraits or illustrations of real life like his father; he wanted to represent the heroes of religion, history and mythology, to idealize them and show them in ways that explained their actions, rivaling the best works of literature and philosophy.

== In Paris (1797–1806) ==
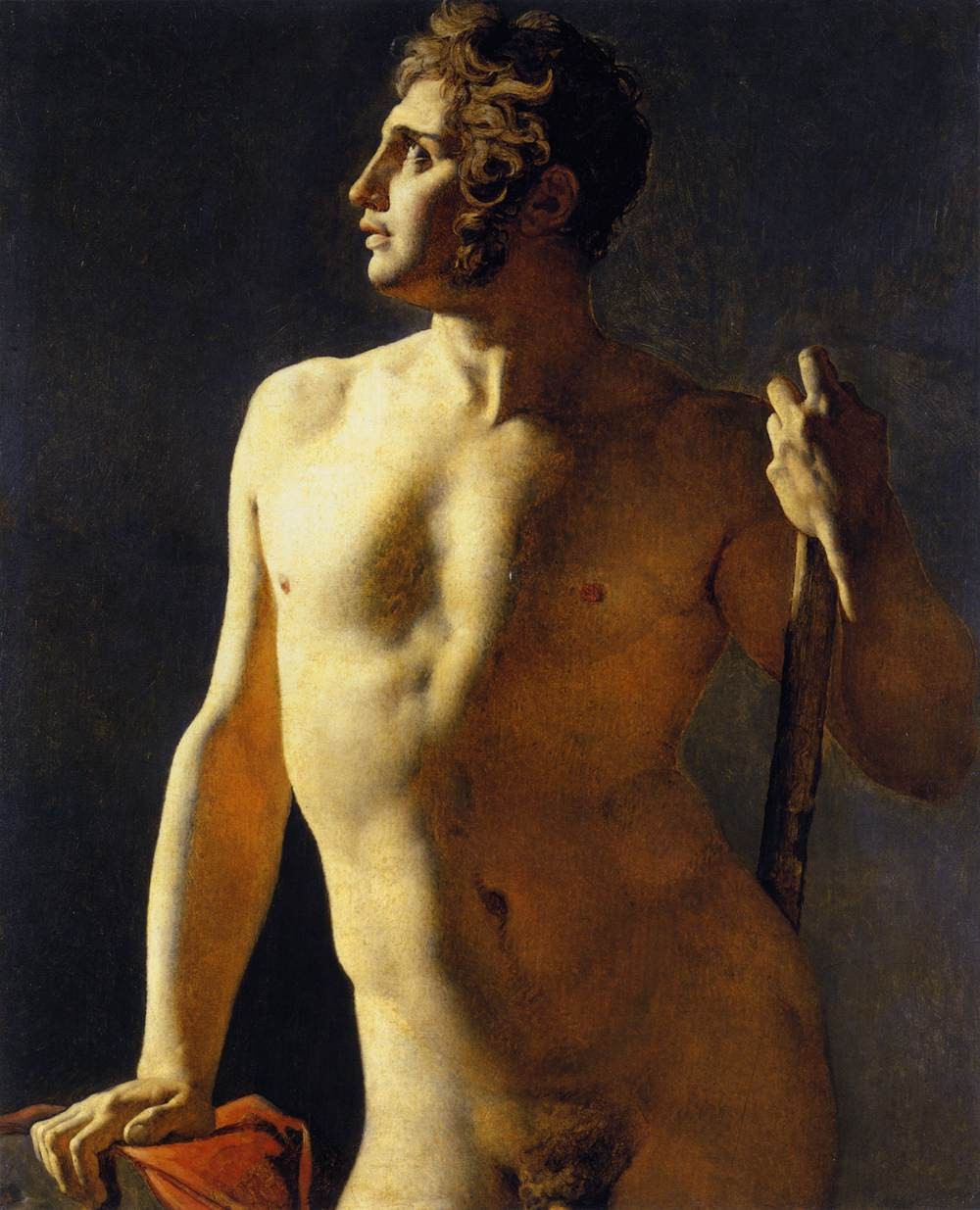
Male Torso (1800), Montauban, Musée Ingres

In March 1797, the Academy awarded Ingres first prize in drawing, and in August he traveled to Paris to study in the studio of Jacques-Louis David, France's—and Europe's—leading painter during the revolutionary period, in whose studio he remained for four years. Ingres followed his master's neoclassical example. In 1797 David was working on his enormous masterpiece, The Intervention of the Sabine Women, and was gradually modifying his style away from Roman models of rigorous realism to the ideals of purity, virtue and simplicity in Greek art.

One of the other students of David, Étienne-Jean Delécluze, who later became an art critic, described Ingres as a student:

He was distinguished not just by the candor of his character and his disposition to work alone ... he was one of the most studious ... he took little part in the all the turbulent follies around him, and he studied with more perseverance than most of his co-disciples ... All of the qualities which characterize today the talent of this artist, the finesse of contour, the true and profound sentiment of the form, and a modeling with extraordinary correctness and firmness, could already be seen in his early studies. While several of his comrades and David himself signaled a tendency toward exaggeration in his studies, everyone was struck by his grand compositions and recognized his talent.

He was admitted to the painting department of the École des Beaux-Arts in October 1799. In 1800 and 1801, he won the grand prize for figure painting for his paintings of male torsos. He competed for the Prix de Rome between 1800 and 1801, for the highest prize of the Academy, which entitled the winner to four years of residence at the French Academy in Rome. He came in second in his first attempt, but in 1801 he took the top prize with The Ambassadors of Agamemnon in the tent of Achilles. The figures of the envoys, in the right of the painting, are muscular and solid as statues, in the style taught by David, but the two main figures on the left, Achilles and Patroclus, are mobile, vivid and graceful, like figures in a delicate bas-relief.

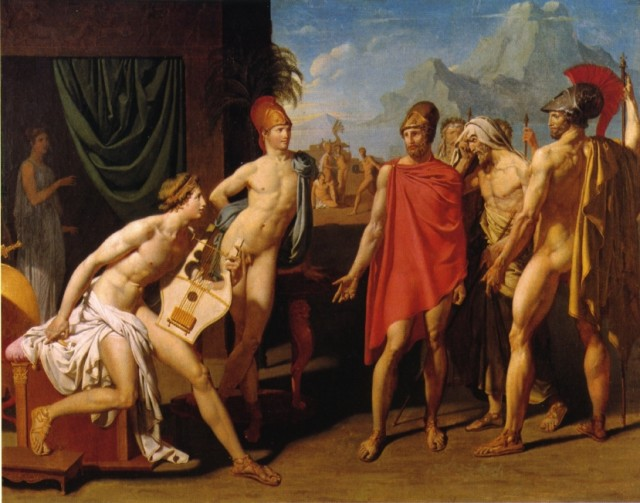
The Envoys of Agamemnon, 1801, oil on canvas, École des Beaux Arts, Paris

His residence in Rome was postponed until 1806 due to a shortage of state funds. In the meantime, he worked in Paris alongside several other students of David in a studio provided by the state, and further developed a style that emphasised purity of contour. He found inspiration in the works of Raphael, in Etruscan vase paintings, and in the outline engravings of the English artist John Flaxman. His drawings of Hermaphrodite and the Nymph Salmacis showed a new stylised ideal of female beauty, which would reappear later in his Jupiter et Thetis and his famous nudes.

In 1802 he made his debut at the Salon with Portrait of a Woman (the current whereabouts of which is unknown). Between 1804 and 1806 he painted a series of portraits which were striking for their extreme precision, particularly in the richness of their fabrics and tiny details. These included the Portrait of Philipbert Riviére (1805), Portrait of Sabine Rivière (1805–06), Portrait of Madame Aymon (also known as La Belle Zélie; 1806), and Portrait of Caroline Rivière (1805–06). The female faces were not at all detailed but were softened, and were notable for their large oval eyes and delicate flesh colours and their rather dreamlike expressions. His portraits typically had simple backgrounds of solid dark or light colour, or of sky. These were the beginning of a series that would make him among the most celebrated portrait artists of the 19th century.

As Ingres waited to depart to Rome, his friend Lorenzo Bartolini introduced him to Italian Renaissance paintings, particularly the works of Bronzino and Pontormo, which Napoleon had brought back from his campaign in Italy and placed in the Louvre. Ingres assimilated their clarity and monumentality into his own portrait style. In the Louvre were also masterpieces of Flemish art, including the Ghent Altarpiece by Jan van Eyck, which the French army had seized during its conquest of Flanders. The precision of Renaissance Flemish art became part of Ingres's style. Ingres's stylistic eclecticism represented a new tendency in art. The Louvre, newly filled with booty seized by Napoleon in his campaigns in Italy and the Low Countries, provided French artists of the early 19th century with an unprecedented opportunity to study, compare, and copy masterworks from antiquity and from the entire history of European painting. As art historian Marjorie Cohn has written: "At the time, art history as a scholarly enquiry was brand-new. Artists and critics outdid each other in their attempts to identify, interpret, and exploit what they were just beginning to perceive as historical stylistic developments." From the beginning of his career, Ingres freely borrowed from earlier art, adopting the historical style appropriate to his subject, and was consequently accused by critics of plundering the past.

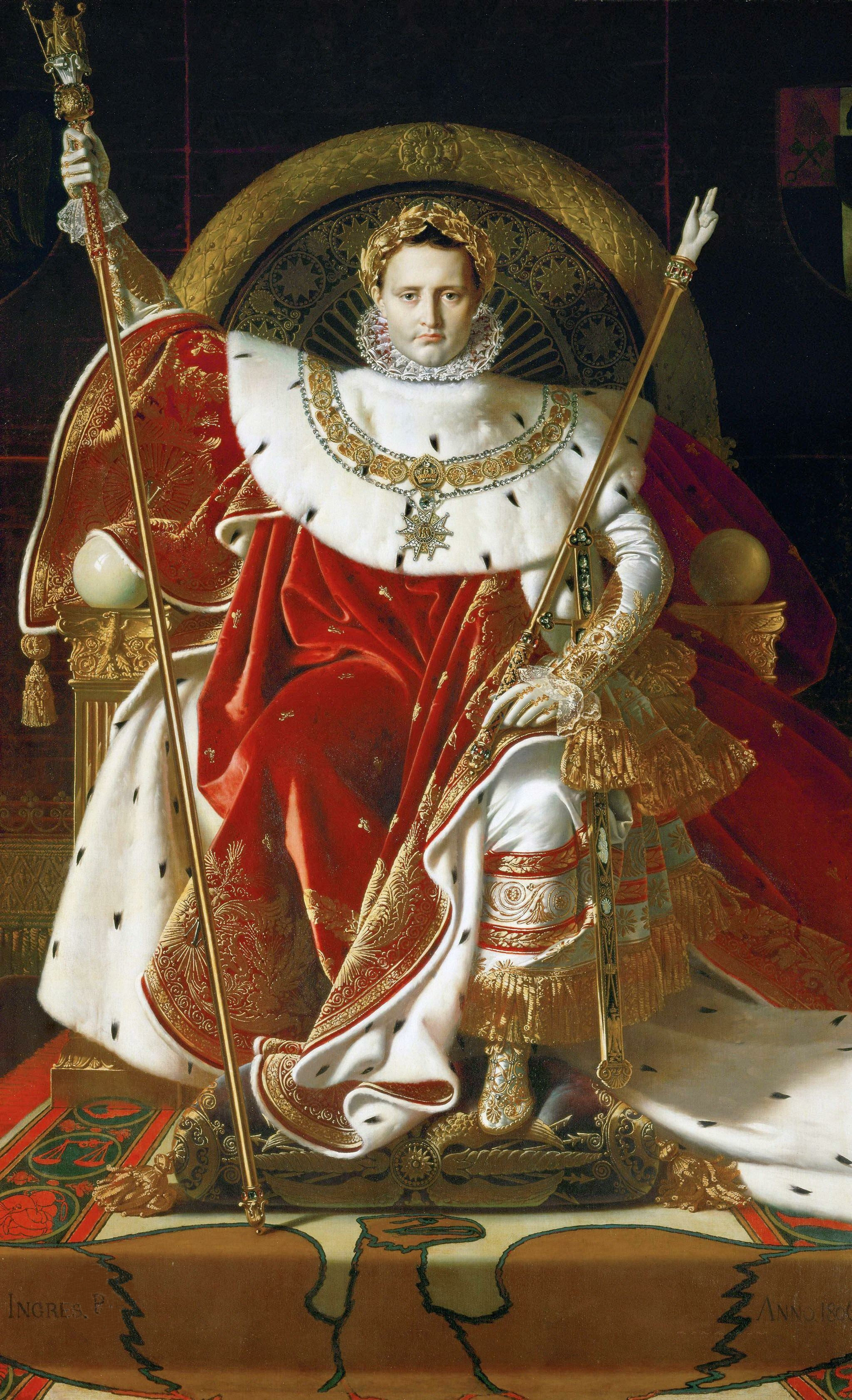
Napoleon I on his Imperial Throne, 1806, oil on canvas, 260 x 163 cm, Musée de l'Armée, Paris

In 1803 he received a prestigious commission, being one of five artists selected (along with Jean-Baptiste Greuze, Robert Lefèvre, Charles Meynier, and Marie-Guillemine Benoist) to paint full-length portraits of Napoleon Bonaparte as First Consul. These were to be distributed to the prefectural towns of Liège, Antwerp, Dunkerque, Brussels, and Ghent, all of which were newly ceded to France in the 1801 Treaty of Lunéville. Napoleon is not known to have granted the artists a sitting, and Ingres's meticulously painted portrait of Bonaparte, First Consul appears to be modelled on an image of Napoleon painted by Antoine-Jean Gros in 1802.

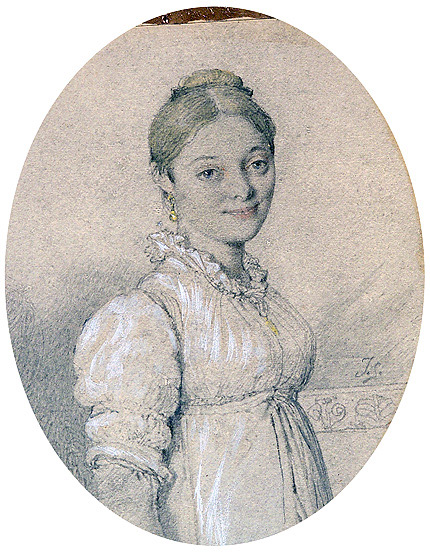
Medallion portrait of Julie Forestier, 1806, by Ingres

In the summer of 1806, Ingres became engaged to Marie-Anne-Julie Forestier, a painter and musician, before leaving for Rome in September. Although he had hoped to stay in Paris long enough to witness the opening of that year's Salon, in which he was to display several works, he reluctantly left for Italy just days before the opening.

Ingres painted a new portrait of Napoleon for presentation at the Salon of 1806, this one showing Napoleon on the Imperial Throne for his coronation. This painting was entirely different from his earlier portrait of Napoleon as First Consul; it concentrated almost entirely on the lavish imperial costume that Napoleon had chosen to wear, and the symbols of power he held. The scepter of Charles V, the sword of Charlemagne the rich fabrics, furs and capes, crown of gold leaves, golden chains and emblems were all presented in extremely precise detail; the Emperor's face and hands were almost lost in the majestic costume.

At the Salon, his paintings—Self-Portrait, portraits of the Rivière family, and Napoleon I on his Imperial Throne—received a very chilly reception. David delivered a severe judgement, and the critics were hostile. Chaussard (Le Pausanias Français, 1806) praised "the fineness of Ingres's brushwork and the finish", but condemned Ingres's style as gothic and asked:

How, with so much talent, a line so flawless, an attention to detail so thorough, has M. Ingres succeeded in painting a bad picture? The answer is that he wanted to do something singular, something extraordinary ... M. Ingres's intention is nothing less than to make art regress by four centuries, to carry us back to its infancy, to revive the manner of Jean de Bruges.

== Rome and the French Academy (1806–1814) ==
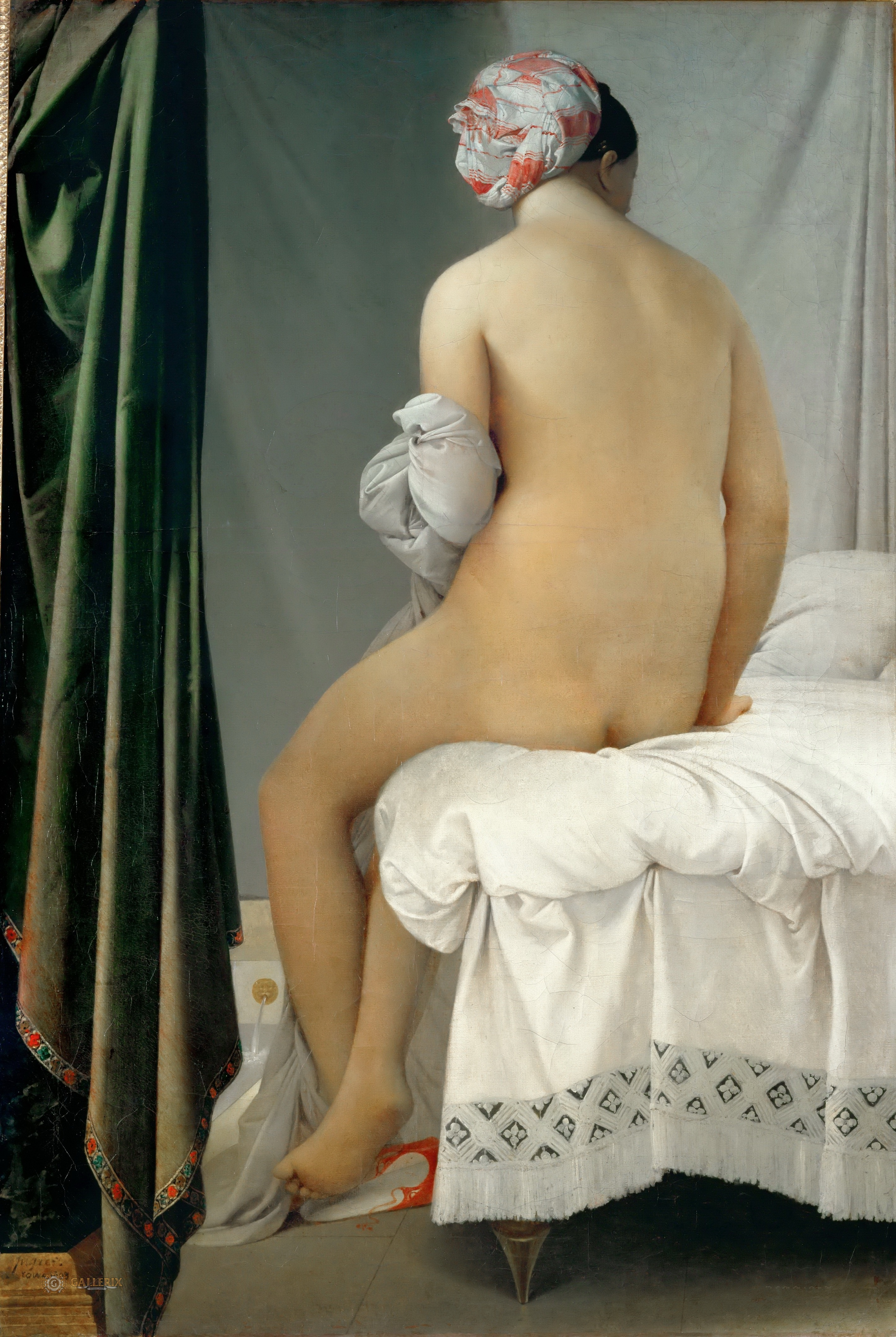
The Grande Baigneuse, also called The Valpinçon Bather (1808), Louvre

Newly arrived in Rome, Ingres read with mounting indignation the relentlessly negative press clippings sent to him from Paris by his friends. In letters to his prospective father-in-law, he expressed his outrage at the critics: "So the Salon is the scene of my disgrace; ... The scoundrels, they waited until I was away to assassinate my reputation ... I have never been so unhappy....I knew I had many enemies; I never was agreeable with them and never will be. My greatest wish would be to fly to the Salon and to confound them with my works, which don't in any way resemble theirs; and the more I advance, the less their work will resemble mine." He vowed never again to exhibit at the Salon, and his refusal to return to Paris led to the breaking up of his engagement. Julie Forestier, when asked years later why she had never married, responded, "When one has had the honor of being engaged to M. Ingres, one does not marry."

On 23 November 1806, he wrote to Jean Forestier, the father of his former fiancée, "Yes, art will need to be reformed, and I intend to be that revolutionary." Characteristically, he found a studio on the grounds of the Villa Medici away from the other resident artists, and painted furiously. Many drawings of monuments in Rome from this time are attributed to Ingres, but it appears from more recent scholarship that they were actually the work of his collaborators, particularly his friend the landscape artist François-Marius Granet. As required of every winner of the Prix, he sent works at regular intervals to Paris so his progress could be judged. Traditionally fellows sent paintings of male Greek or Roman heroes, but for his first samples Ingres sent Baigneuse à mi-corps (1807), a painting of the back of a young woman bathing, based on an engraving of an antique vase, and La Grande Bagneuse (1808), a larger painting of the back of a nude bather, and the first Ingres model to wear a turban, a detail he borrowed from the Fornarina by his favourite painter, Raphael. To satisfy the Academy in Paris, he also dispatched Oedipus and the Sphinx to show his mastery of the male nude. The verdict of the academicians in Paris was that the figures were not sufficiently idealized. In later years Ingres painted several variants of these compositions; another nude begun in 1807, the Venus Anadyomene, remained in an unfinished state for decades, to be completed forty years later and finally exhibited in 1855.

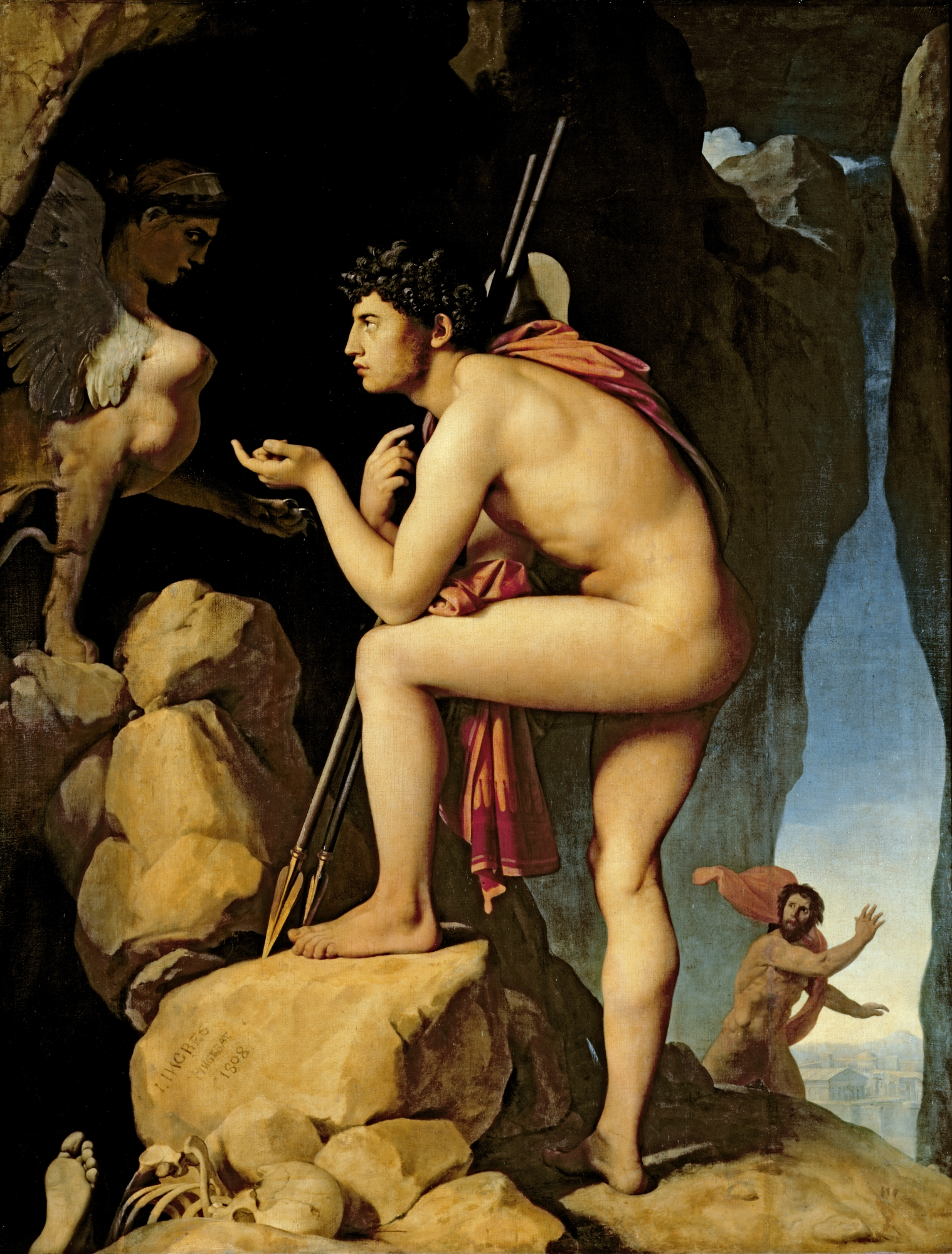
Oedipus and the Sphinx (1808), Louvre

During his time in Rome he also painted numerous portraits: Madame Duvaucey (1807), François-Marius Granet (1807), Joseph-Antoine Moltedo (1810), Madame Panckoucke (1811), and Charles-Joseph-Laurent Cordier (1811). In 1812 he painted one of his few portraits of an older woman, Comtesse de Tournon, mother of the prefect of Rome. In 1810 Ingres's pension at the Villa Medici ended, but he decided to stay in Rome and seek patronage from the French occupation government.

In 1811 Ingres completed his final student exercise, the immense Jupiter and Thetis, a scene from the Iliad of Homer: the goddess of the Sea, Thetis, pleads with Zeus to act in favor of her son Achilles. The face of the water nymph Salmacis he had drawn years earlier reappeared as Thetis. Ingres wrote with enthusiasm that he had been planning to paint this subject since 1806, and he intended to "deploy all of the luxury of art in its beauty". However, once again, the critics were hostile, finding fault with the exaggerated proportions of the figures and the painting's flat, airless quality.

Although facing uncertain prospects, in 1813 Ingres married a young woman, Madeleine Chapelle, recommended to him by her friends in Rome. After a courtship carried out through correspondence, he proposed without having met her, and she accepted. Their marriage was happy, and Madame Ingres's faith in her husband was unwavering. After a difficult childbirth in 1815 resulted in a stillborn baby, the couple remained childless. Ingres continued to suffer disparaging reviews, as Don Pedro of Toledo Kissing Henry IV's Sword, Raphael and the Fornarina (Fogg Art Museum, Harvard University), several portraits, and the Interior of the Sistine Chapel met with generally hostile critical response at the Paris Salon of 1814.

== Rome after the Academy and Florence (1814–1824) ==
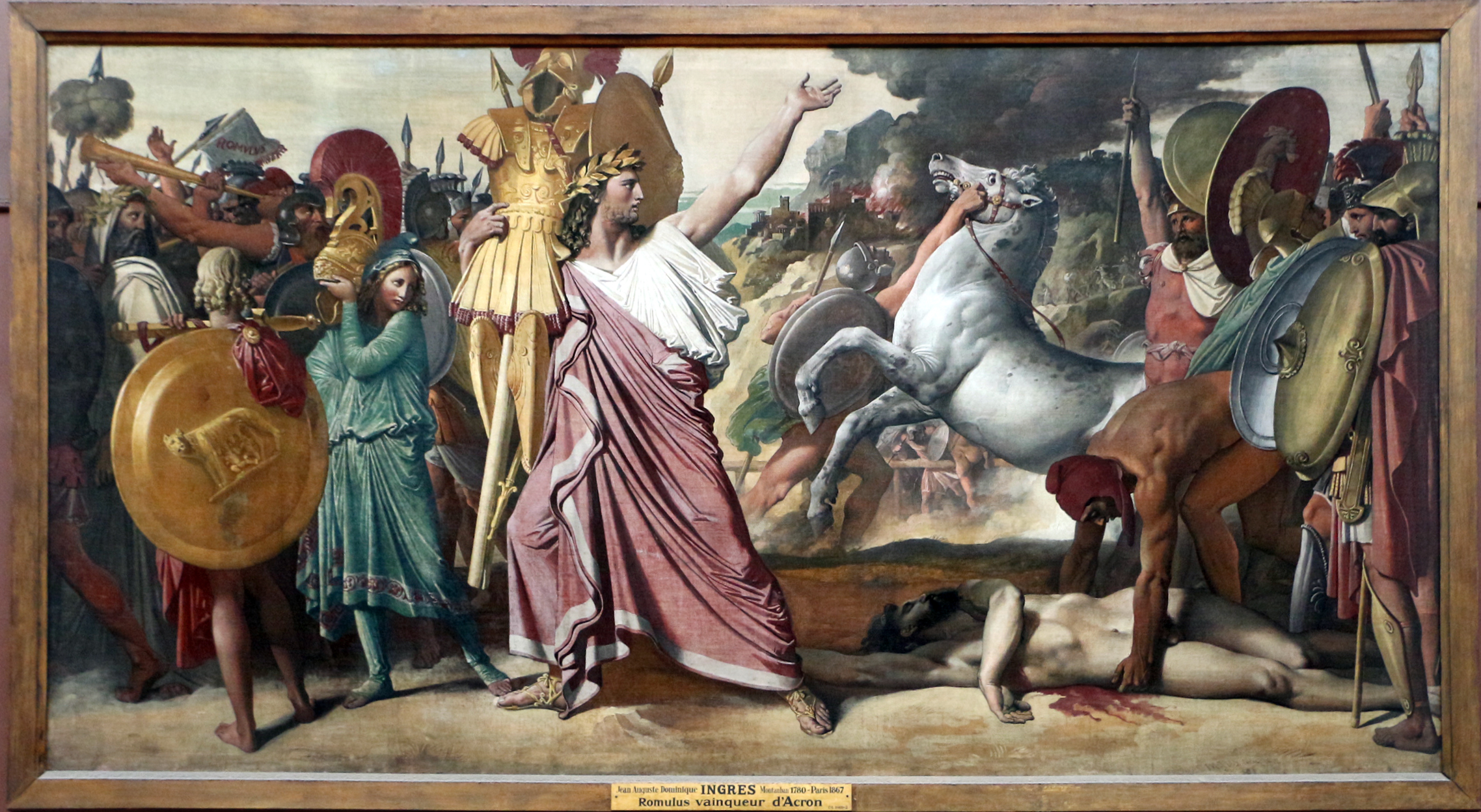
Romulus' Victory Over Acron (1811), the Louvre

After he left the Academy, a few important commissions came to him. The French governor of Rome, General Miollis, a wealthy patron of the arts, asked him to decorate rooms of the Monte Cavallo Palace, a former papal residence, for an expected visit of Napoleon. Ingres painted a large-scale Romulus' Victory Over Acron (1811) for the salon of the Empress and The Dream of Ossian (1813), based on a book of poems that Napoleon admired, for the ceiling of the Emperor's bedroom. General Miollis also commissioned Ingres to paint Virgil reading The Aeneid before Augustus, Livia and Octavia (1812) for his own residence, the villa Aldobrandini. The painting shows the moment when Virgil, reciting his work to the Emperor Augustus, his wife Livia and his sister Octavia, mentions the name of Octavia's dead son, Marcellus, causing Octavia to faint. The interior was precisely depicted, following the archeological finds at Pompeii. As usual, Ingres made several versions of the same scene: a three-figure fragment cut from an abandoned version is in the Royal Museums of Fine Arts of Belgium in Brussels, and in 1825 he made a chalk drawing in vertical format as a model for a reproductive engraving made by Pradier in 1832. The General Miollis version was repurchased by Ingres in the 1830s, reworked by assistants under Ingres's direction, and never finished; The Dream of Ossian was likewise repurchased, modified, but left unfinished.

He traveled to Naples in the spring of 1814 to paint Queen Caroline Murat. Joachim Murat, the King of Naples, had earlier purchased the Dormeuse de Naples, a sleeping nude (the original is lost, but several drawings exist, and Ingres later revisited the subject in L'Odalisque à l'esclave). Murat also commissioned two historical paintings, Raphael et la Fornarina and Paolo et Francesca, and what later became one of Ingres's most famous works, La Grande Odalisque, to accompany Dormeuse de Naples. Ingres never received payment, due to the collapse of the Murat regime and execution of Joachim Murat in 1815. With the fall of Napoleon's dynasty, he found himself essentially stranded in Rome without patronage.

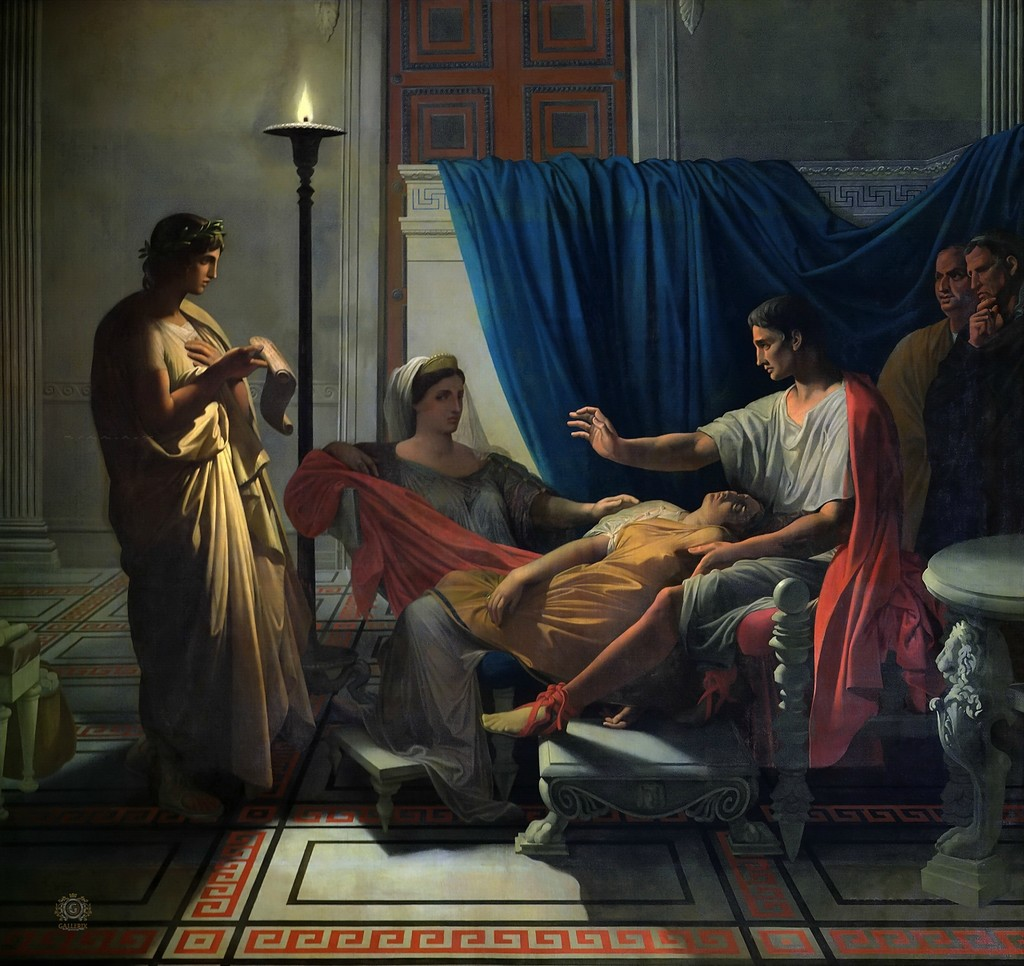
Virgil reading The Aeneid before Augustus, Livia and Octavia (1812, later reworked), Toulouse, Musée des Augustins

He continued to produce masterful portraits, in pencil and oils, of almost photographic precision; but with the departure of the French administration, the painting commissions were rare. During this low point of his career, Ingres augmented his income by drawing pencil portraits of the many wealthy tourists, in particular the English, passing through postwar Rome. For an artist who aspired to a reputation as a history painter, this seemed menial work, and to the visitors who knocked on his door asking, "Is this where the man who draws the little portraits lives?", he would answer with irritation, "No, the man who lives here is a painter!" The portrait drawings he produced in such profusion during this period rank today among his most admired works. He is estimated to have made some five hundred portrait drawings, including portraits of his famous friends. His friends included many musicians including Paganini, and he regularly played the violin with others who shared his enthusiasm for Mozart, Haydn, Gluck, and Beethoven.

He also produced a series of small paintings in what was known as the Troubador style, idealized portrayals of events in the Middle Ages and Renaissance. In 1815 he painted Aretino and Charles V's Ambassador as well as Aretino and Tintoretto, an anecdotal painting whose subject, a painter brandishing a pistol at his critic, may have been especially satisfying to the embattled Ingres. Other paintings in the same style included Henry IV Playing with His Children (1817) and the Death of Leonardo.

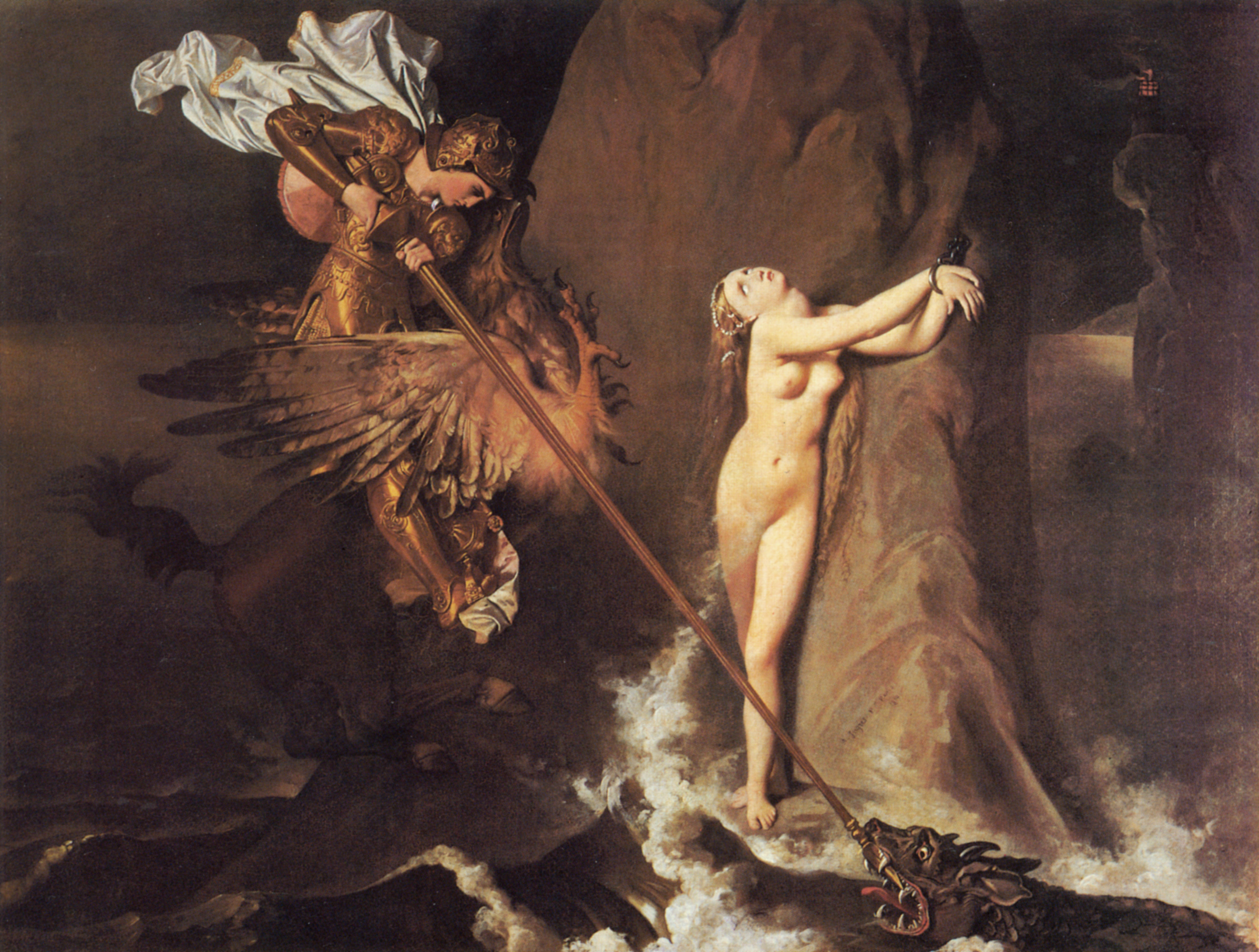
Roger Delivrant Angelique (1819), The Louvre

In 1816 Ingres produced his only etching, a portrait of the French ambassador to Rome, Monsignor Gabriel Cortois de Pressigny. The only other prints he is known to have executed are two lithographs: The Four Magistrates of Besançon, made as an illustration for Baron Taylor's Voyages pittoresques et romantiques dans l'ancienne France, and a copy of La Grande Odalisque, both in 1825.

In 1817 the Count of Blacas, who was ambassador of France to the Holy See, provided Ingres with his first official commission since 1814, for a painting of Christ Giving the Keys to Peter. Completed in 1820, this imposing work was well received in Rome but to the artist's chagrin the ecclesiastical authorities there would not permit it to be sent to Paris for exhibition.

A commission came in 1816 or 1817 from the descendants of the Fernando Álvarez de Toledo, Duke of Alva, for a painting of the Duke receiving papal honours for his repression of the Protestant Reformation. Ingres loathed the subject—he regarded the Duke as one of history's brutes—and struggled to satisfy both the commission and his conscience. After revisions which eventually reduced the Duke to a tiny figure in the background, Ingres left the work unfinished. He entered in his diary, "J'etais forcé par la necessité de peindre un pareil tableau; Dieu a voulu qu'il reste en ebauche." ("I was forced by need to paint such a painting; God wanted it to remain a sketch.")

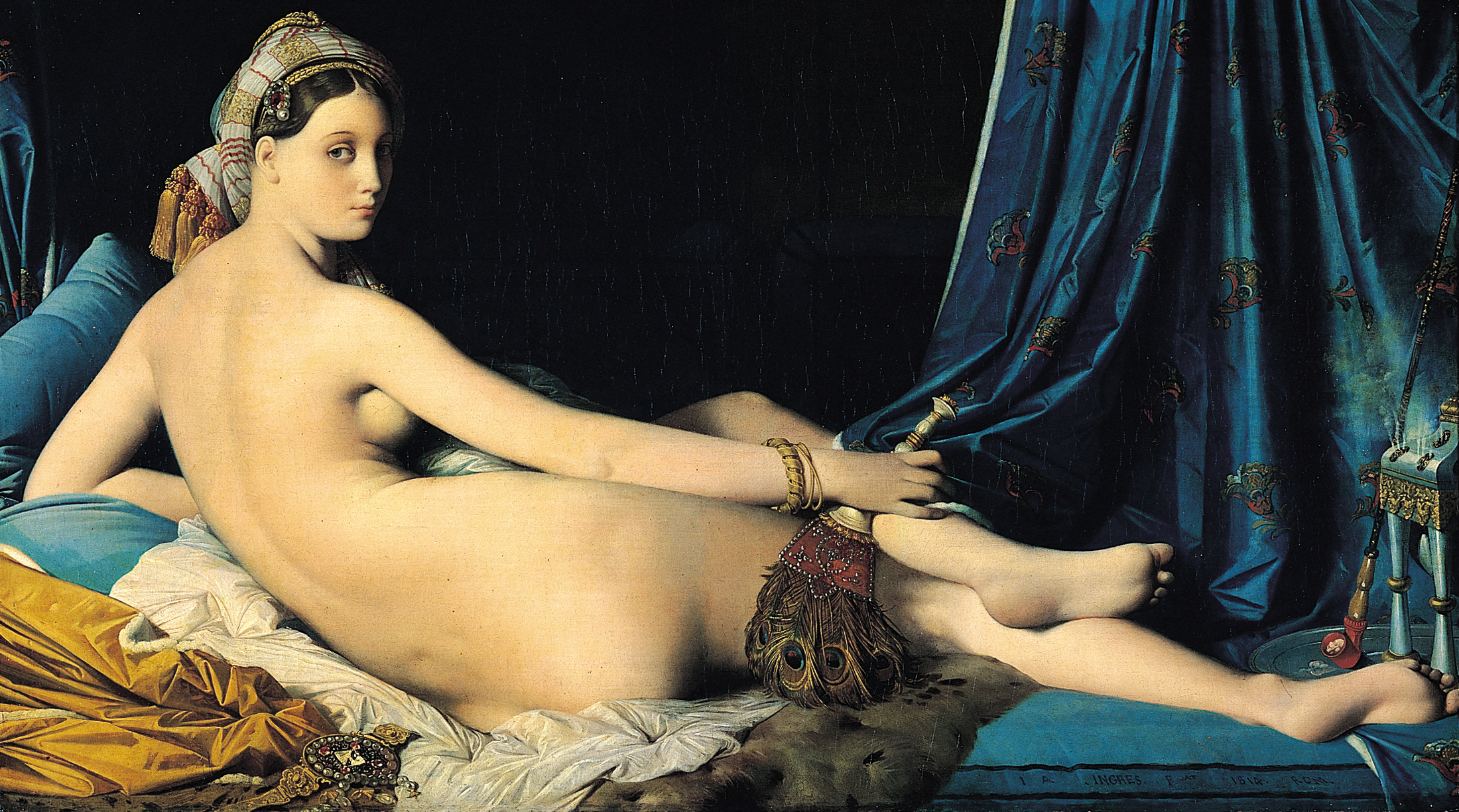
La Grande Odalisque (1814), the Louvre

He continued to send works to the Salon in Paris, hoping to make his breakthrough there. In 1819 he sent his reclining nude, La Grande Odalisque, as well as a history painting, Philip V and the Marshal of Berwick, and Roger Freeing Angelica, based on an episode in the 16th-century epic poem Orlando Furioso by Ariosto but his work was once again condemned by critics as gothic and unnatural. The critic Kératy complained that the Grande Odalisque's back was three vertebrae too long. The critic Charles Landon wrote: "After a moment of attention, one sees that in this figure there are no bones, no muscles, no blood, no life, no relief, no anything which constitutes imitation....it is evident that the artist deliberately erred, that he wanted to do it badly, that he believed in bringing back to life the pure and primitive manner of the painters of Antiquity; but he took for his model a few fragments from earlier periods and a degenerate execution, and completely lost his way."

In 1820 Ingres and his wife moved to Florence at the urging of the Florentine sculptor Lorenzo Bartolini, an old friend from his years in Paris. He still had to depend upon his portraits and drawings for income, but his luck began to change. His history painting Roger Freeing Angelica was purchased for the private collection of Louis XVIII, and was hung in the Musée du Luxembourg in Paris, which was newly devoted to the work of living artists. This was the first work of Ingres to enter a museum.

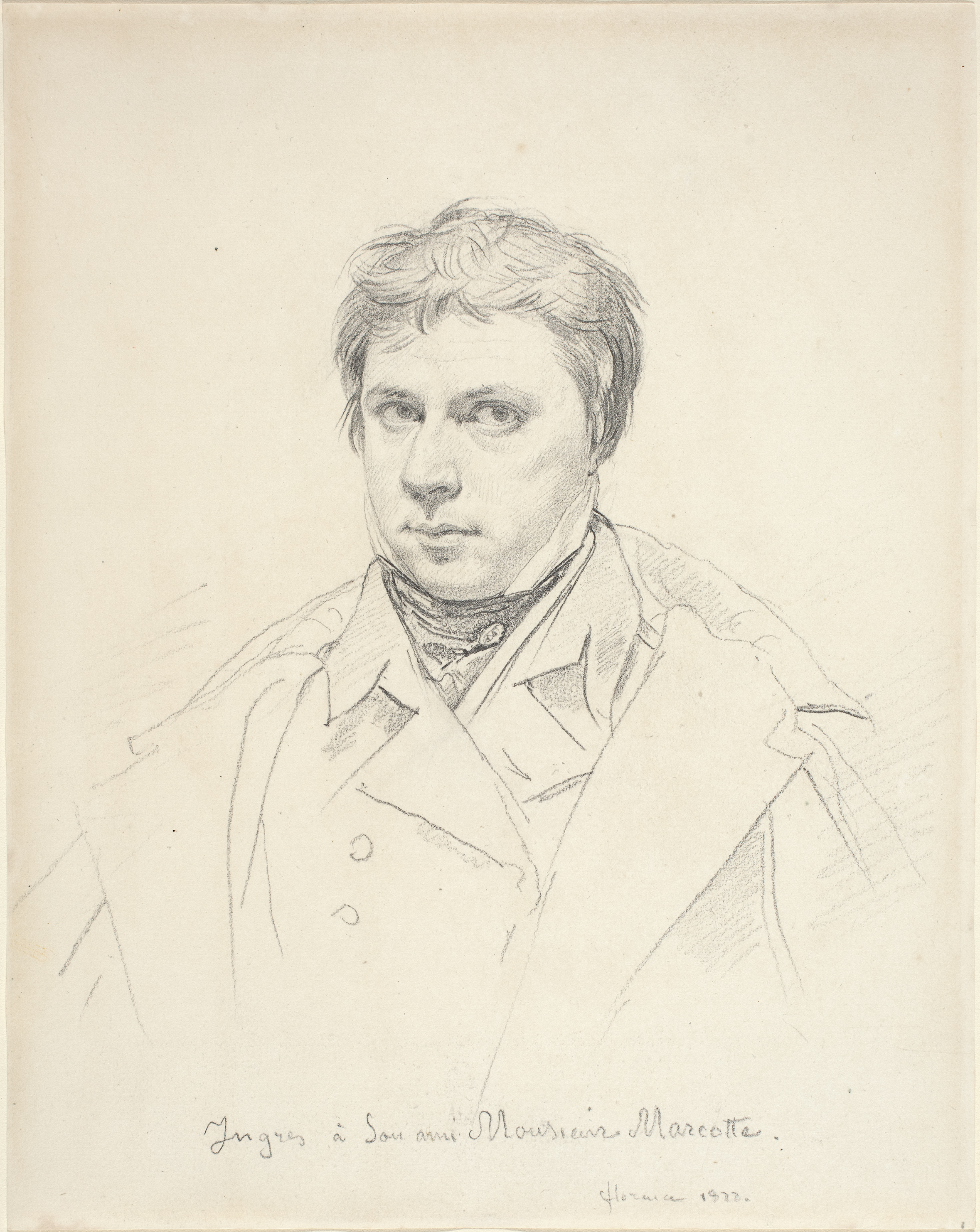
Self-Portrait, 1822, National Gallery of Art

In 1821, he finished a painting commissioned by a childhood friend, Monsieur de Pastoret, The Entry into Paris of the Dauphin, the Future Charles V; de Pastoret also ordered a portrait of himself and a religious work (Virgin with the Blue Veil). In August 1820, with the help of de Pastoret, he received a commission for a major religious painting for the Cathedral of Montauban. The theme was the re-establishment of the bond between the church and the state. Ingres's painting, The Vow of Louis XIII (1824), inspired by Raphael, was purely in the Renaissance style, and depicted King Louis XIII vowing to dedicate his reign to the Virgin Mary. This was perfectly in tune with the doctrine of the new government of the Restoration. He spent four years bringing the large canvas to completion, and he took it to the Paris Salon in October 1824, where it became the key that finally opened the door of the Paris art establishment and to his career as an official painter.

== Return to Paris and retreat to Rome (1824–1834) ==
The Vow of Louis XIII (1824), Cathedral of Notre-Dame, Montauban

The Vow of Louis XIII in the Salon of 1824 finally brought Ingres critical success. Although Stendhal complained about "the sort of material beauty which excludes the idea of divinity", most critics praised the work. The journalist and future Prime Minister and French President Adolphe Thiers celebrated the breakthrough of a new style: "Nothing is better than variety like this, the essential character of the new style." In January 1825 Ingres was awarded the Cross of the Légion d'honneur by Charles X, and in June 1825 he was elected a member of Académie des Beaux-Arts. Lithographs of La Grande Odalisque published in 1826 in two competing versions by Delpech and Sudré found eager buyers; Ingres received 24,000 francs for the reproduction rights – twenty times the amount he had been paid for the original painting six years earlier. The 1824 Salon also brought forward a counter-current to the neoclassicism of Ingres: Eugène Delacroix exhibited Les Massacres de Scio, in a romantic style sharply contrasting to that of Ingres.

The success of Ingres's painting led in 1826 to a major new commission, The Apotheosis of Homer, a giant canvas which celebrated all the great artists of history, intended to decorate the ceiling of one of the halls of the Museum Charles X at the Louvre. Ingres was unable to finish the work in time for the 1827 Salon, but displayed the painting in grisaille. The 1827 Salon became a confrontation between the neoclassicism of Ingres's Apotheosis and a new manifesto of romanticism by Delacroix, The Death of Sardanapalus. Ingres joined the battle with enthusiasm; he called Delacroix "the apostle of ugliness" and told friends that he recognized "the talent, the honorable character and distinguished spirit" of Delacroix, but that "he has tendencies which I believe are dangerous and which I must push back."

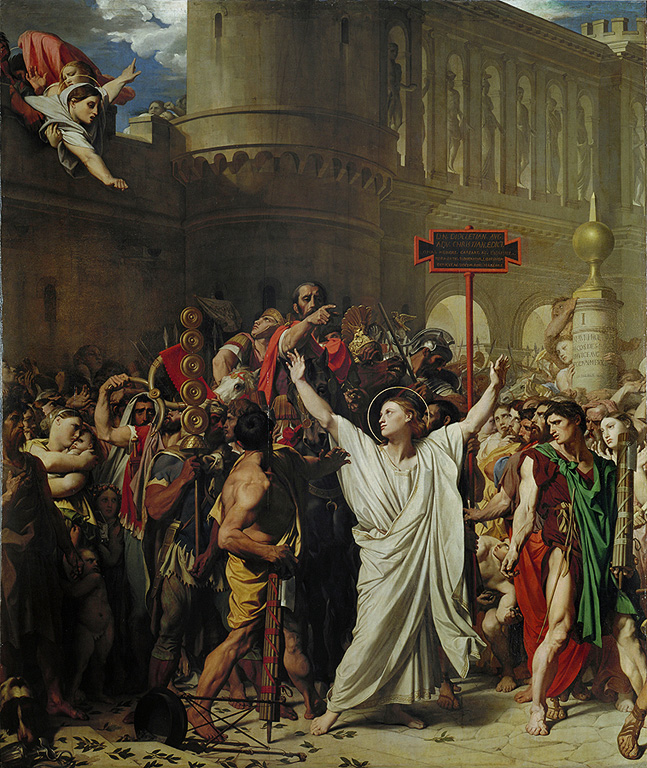
The Martyrdom of Saint Symphorian (1834), Cathedral of Autun

Despite the considerable patronage he enjoyed under the Bourbon government, Ingres welcomed the July Revolution of 1830. That the outcome of the Revolution was not a republic but a constitutional monarchy was satisfactory to the essentially conservative and pacifistic artist, who in a letter to a friend in August 1830 criticized agitators who "still want to soil and disturb the order and happiness of a freedom so gloriously, so divinely won." Ingres's career was little affected, and he continued to receive official commissions and honors under the July Monarchy.

Ingres exhibited in the Salon of 1833, where his portrait of Louis-François Bertin (1832) was a particular success. The public found its realism spellbinding, although some of the critics declared its naturalism vulgar and its colouring drab. In 1834 he finished a large religious painting, The Martyrdom of Saint Symphorian, which depicted the first saint to be martyred in Gaul. The painting was commissioned in 1824 by the Ministry of the Interior for the Cathedral of Autun, and the iconography in the picture was specified by the bishop. Ingres conceived the painting as the summation of all of his work and skill, and worked on it for ten years before displaying it at the Salon of 1834. He was surprised, shocked and angered by the response; the painting was attacked by both the neoclassicists and by the romantics. Ingres was accused of historical inaccuracy, for the colours, and for the feminine appearance of the Saint, who looked like a beautiful statue. In anger, Ingres announced that he would no longer accept public commissions, and that he would no longer participate in the Salon. He later did participate in some semi-public expositions and a retrospective of his work at the 1855 Paris International Exposition, but never again took part in the Salon or submitted his work for public judgement. Instead, at the end of 1834 he returned to Rome to become the Director of the Academy of France.

== Director of the French Academy in Rome (1834–1841) ==
Ingres remained in Rome for six years. He devoted much of his attention to the training of the painting students, as he was later to do at the École des Beaux-Arts in Paris. He re-organized the Academy, increased the size of the library, added many molds of classical statues to the Academy collection, and assisted the students in getting public commissions in both Rome and Paris. He traveled to Orvieto (1835), Siena (1835), and to Ravenna and Urbino to study the paleochristian mosaics, medieval murals and Renaissance art. He devoted considerable attention to music, one of the subjects of the academy; he welcomed Franz Liszt and Fanny Mendelssohn. He formed a long friendship with Liszt. Composer Charles Gounod, who was a pensioner at the time at the Academy, described Ingres's appreciation of modern music, including Weber and Berlioz, and his adoration for Beethoven, Haydn, Mozart and Gluck. He joined the music students and his friend Niccolò Paganini in playing Beethoven's violin works. Gounod wrote that Ingres "had the tenderness of an infant and the indignation of an apostle." When Stendhal visited the Academy and disparaged Beethoven, Ingres turned to the doorman, indicated Stendhal, and told him, "If this gentleman ever calls again, I am not here."

His rancor against the Paris art establishment for his failure at the 1834 Salon did not abate. In 1836 he refused a major commission from the French Minister of the Interior, Adolphe Thiers, to decorate the interior of the Church of the Madeleine in Paris, because the commission had been offered first to a rival, Paul Delaroche, who refused it. He did complete a small number of works which he sent to patrons in Paris. One was L'Odalisque et l'esclave, (1839), a portrait of a blonde odalisque, or member of a harem, who reclines languorously while a turbaned musician plays. This fitted into the popular genre of orientalism; his rival Eugène Delacroix had created a painting on a similar theme, Les Femmes d'Alger, for the 1834 Salon. The setting was inspired by Persian miniatures and was full of exotic detail, but the woman's long reclining form was pure Ingres. The critic Théophile Gautier wrote of Ingres's work: "It is impossible to better paint the mystery, the silence and the suffocating atmosphere of the seraglio." In 1842 he painted a second version, nearly identical to the first but with a landscape background (painted by his student Paul Flandrin).

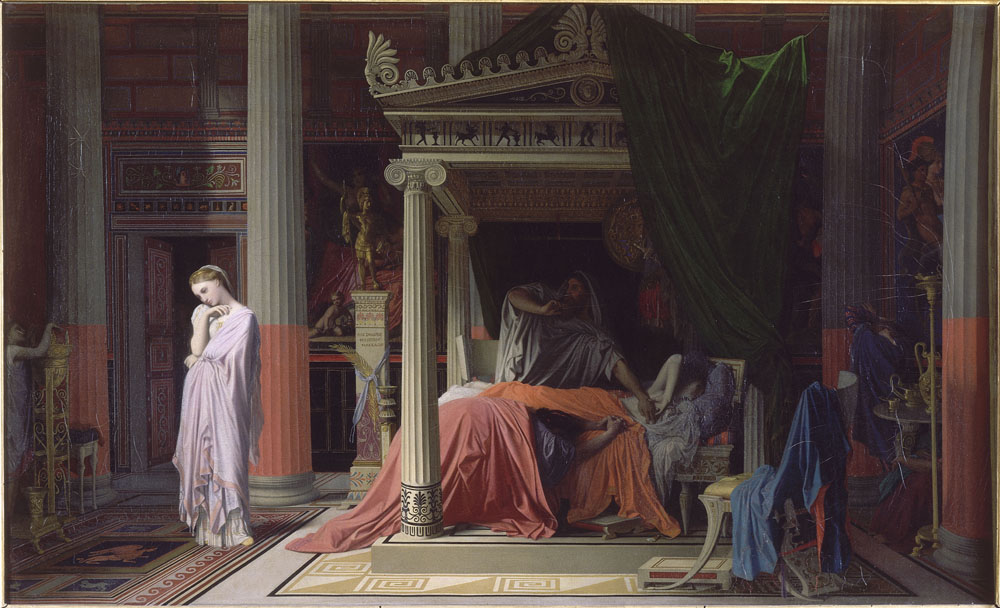
The Illness of Antiochus (1840), Musée Condé, Chantilly

The second painting he sent, in 1840, was The Illness of Antiochus (1840; also known as Aniochus and Stratonice) a history painting on a theme of love and sacrifice, a theme once painted by David in 1800, when Ingres was in his studio. It was commissioned by the Duc d'Orleans, the son of King Louis Philippe I), and had very elaborate architectural background designed by one of the Academy students, Victor Baltard, the future architect of the Paris market Les Halles. The central figure was an ethereal woman in a pastel robe, whose contemplative pose with her hand on her chin recurs in some of Ingres's female portraits.

His painting of Aniochius and Stratonice, despite its small size, just one meter, was a major success for Ingres. In August it was shown in the private apartment of the duc d'Orléans in the Pavilion Marsan of the Palais des Tuileries. The King greeted him personally at Versailles and gave him a tour of the Palace. He was offered a commission to paint a portrait of the Duke, the heir to the throne, and another from the Duc de Lunyes to create two huge murals for the Château de Dampierre. In April 1841 he returned definitively to Paris.

== Last years (1841–1867) ==
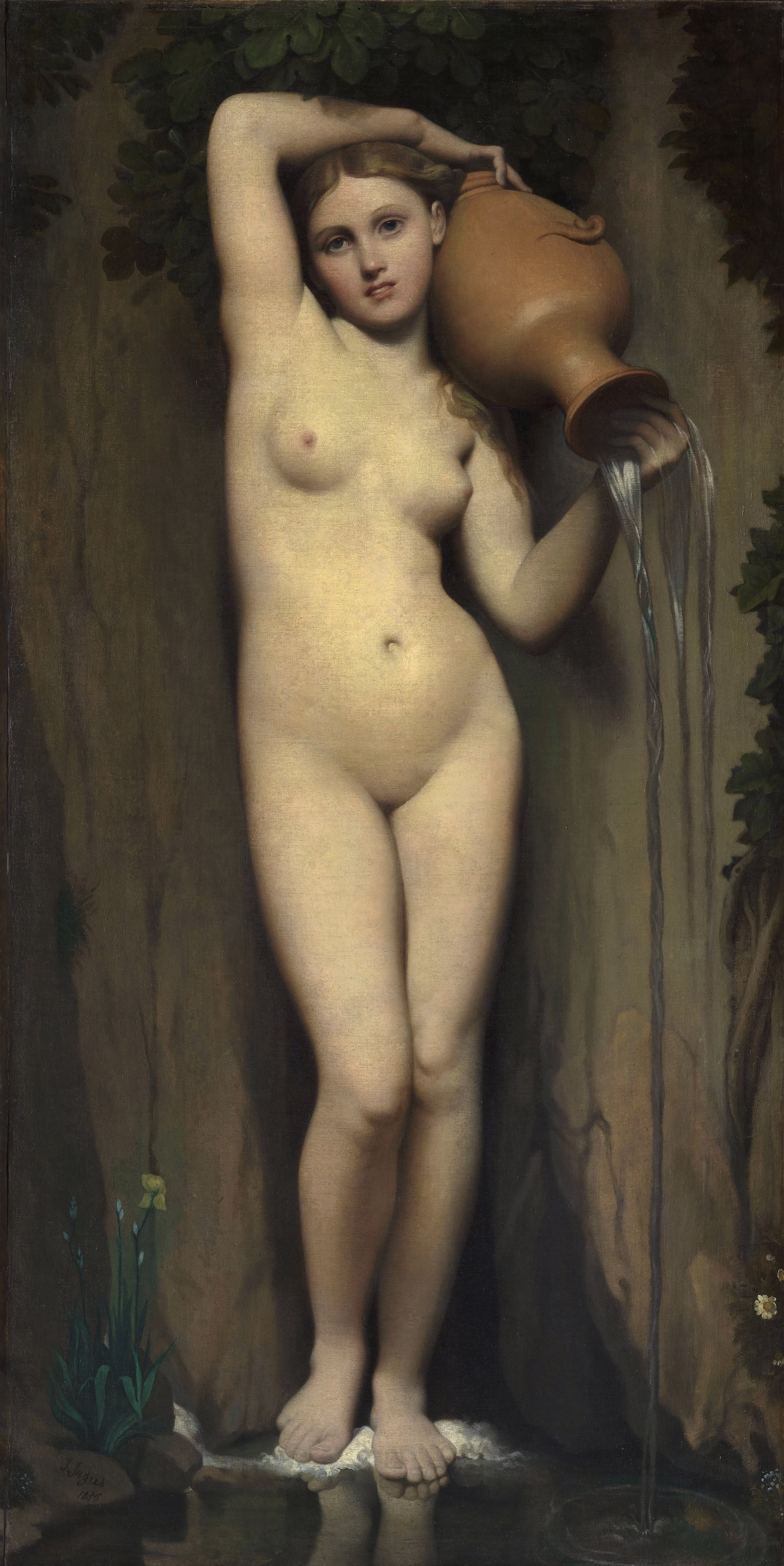
The Source (1856), Musée d'Orsay, Paris

One of the first works executed after his return to Paris was a portrait of the duc d'Orléans. After the heir to the throne was killed in a carriage accident a few months after the painting was completed in 1842, Ingres received commissions to make additional copies. He also received a commission to design seventeen stained glass windows for the chapel on the place where the accident occurred, and a commission for eight additional stained-glass designs for Orléans chapel in Dreux. He became a professor at the Ecole des Beaux-Arts in Paris. He took his students frequently to the Louvre to the see the classical and Renaissance art, instructing them to look straight ahead and to avoid the works of Rubens, which he believed deviated too far from the true values of art.

The Revolution of 1848, which overthrew Louis Philippe and created the French Second Republic, had little effect on his work or his ideas. He declared that the revolutionaries were "cannibals who called themselves French", but during the Revolution completed his Venus Anadyomene, which he had started as an academic study in 1808. It represented Venus, rising from the sea which had given birth to her, surrounded by cherubs. He welcomed the patronage of the new government of Louis-Napoleon, who in 1852 became Emperor Napoleon III.

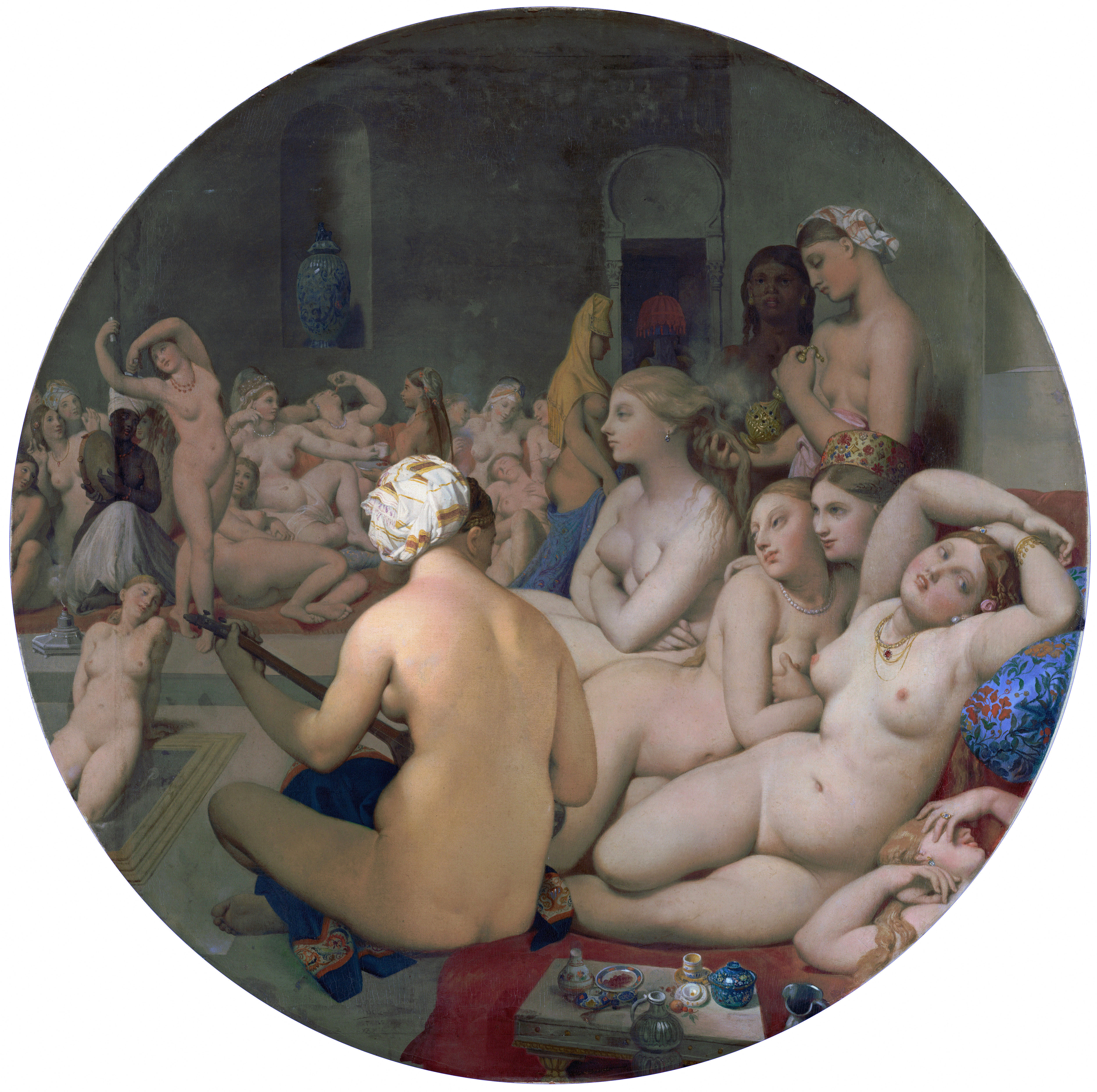
The Turkish Bath (1862–63), The Louvre

In 1843 Ingres began the decorations of the great hall in the Château de Dampierre with two large murals, the Golden Age and the Iron Age, illustrating the origins of art. He made more than five hundred preparatory drawings, and worked on the enormous project for six years. In an attempt to imitate the effect of Renaissance frescos, he chose to paint the murals in oil on plaster, which created technical difficulties. Work on the Iron Age never progressed beyond the architectural background painted by an assistant. Meanwhile, the growing crowd of nudes in the Golden Age discomfited Ingres's patron, the Duc de Luynes, and Ingres suspended work on the mural in 1847. Ingres was devastated by the loss of his wife, who died on 27 July 1849, and he was finally unable to complete the work. In July 1851, he announced a gift of his artwork to his native city of Montauban, and in October he resigned as professor at the École des Beaux-Arts.

However, in 1852, Ingres, then seventy-one years of age, married forty-three-year-old Delphine Ramel, a relative of his friend Marcotte d'Argenteuil. Ingres was rejuvenated, and in the decade that followed he completed several significant works, including the portrait of Princesse Albert de Broglie, née Joséphine-Eléonore-Marie-Pauline de Galard de Brassac de Béarn. In 1853 he began the Apotheosis of Napoleon I, for the ceiling of a hall in the Hôtel de Ville, Paris. (It was destroyed in May 1871 when the Paris Commune set fire to the building.) With the help of assistants, in 1854 he completed another history painting, Joan of Arc at the Coronation of Charles VII. A retrospective of his works was featured at the Paris Universal Exposition of 1855, and in the same year Napoleon III named him a Grand Officer of the Légion d'honneur. In 1862 he was awarded the title of Senator, and made a member of the Imperial Council on Public Instruction. Three of his works were shown in the London International Exhibition, and his reputation as a major French painter was confirmed once more.

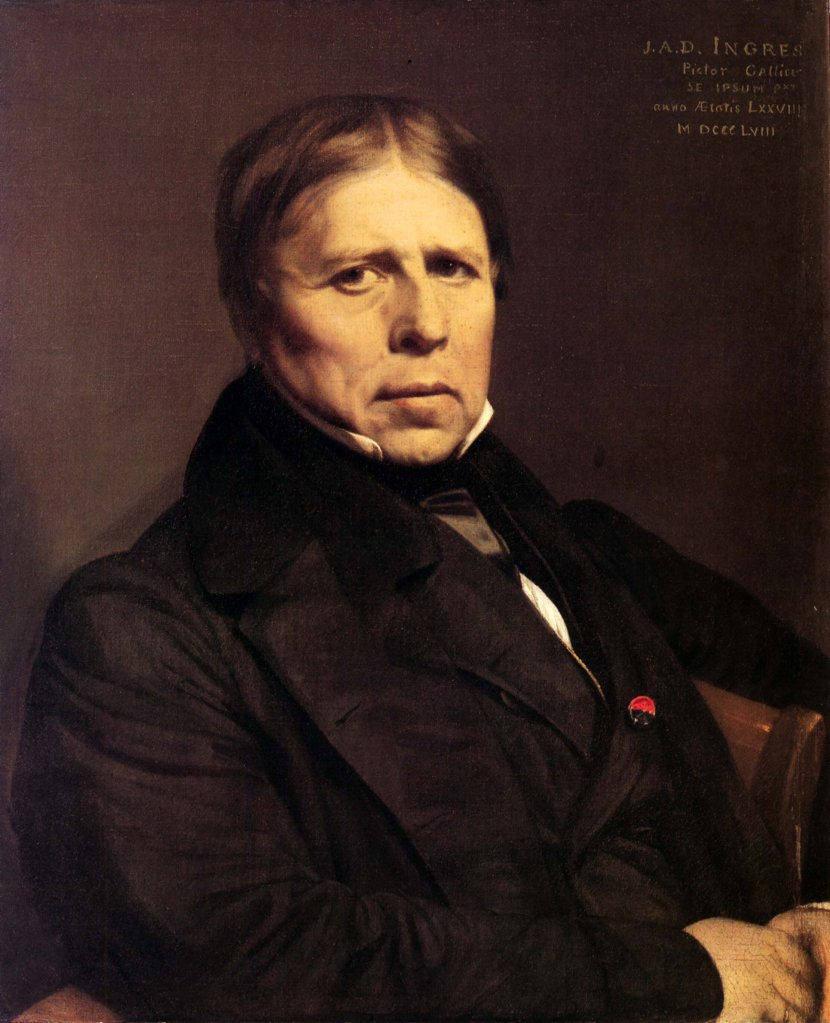
Self-Portrait at Seventy-Eight (1858), Uffizi Gallery, Florence

He continued to rework and refine his classic themes. In 1856 Ingres completed The Source (The Spring), a painting begun in 1820 and closely related to his Venus Anadyoméne. He painted two versions of Louis XIV and Molière (1857 and 1860), and produced variant copies of several of his earlier compositions. These included religious works in which the figure of the Virgin from The Vow of Louis XIII was reprised: The Virgin of the Adoption of 1858 (painted for Mademoiselle Roland-Gosselin) was followed by The Virgin Crowned (painted for Madame la Baronne de Larinthie) and The Virgin with Child. In 1859 he produced new versions of The Virgin of the Host, and in 1862 he completed Christ and the Doctors, a work commissioned many years before by Queen Marie Amalie for the chapel of Bizy. He painted small replicas of Paolo and Francesca and Oedipus and the Sphinx. In 1862 he completed a small oil-on-paper version of The Golden Age. The last of his important portrait paintings date from this period: Marie-Clothilde-Inés de Foucauld, Madame Moitessier, Seated (1856), Self-Portrait at the Age of Seventy-eight and Madame J.-A.-D. Ingres, née Delphine Ramel, both completed in 1859. At the request of the Uffizi Gallery of Florence, he made his own-self portrait in 1858. The only colour in the painting is the red of his rosette of the Legion of Honour.

Near the end of his life, he made one of his best-known masterpieces, The Turkish Bath. It reprised a figure and theme he had been painting since 1828, with his Petite Baigneuse. Originally completed in a square format in 1852 and sold to Prince Napoleon in 1859, it was returned to the artist soon afterward—according to a legend, Princess Clothilde was shocked by the abundant nudity. After reworking the painting as a tondo, Ingres signed and dated it in 1862, although he made additional revisions in 1863. The painting was eventually purchased by a Turkish diplomat, Khalid Bey, who owned a large collection of nudes and erotic art, including several paintings by Courbet. The painting continued to cause a scandal long after Ingres was dead. It was initially offered to the Louvre in 1907, but was rejected, before being given to the Louvre in 1911.

Ingres died of pneumonia on 14 January 1867, at the age of eighty-six, in his apartment on the Quai Voltaire in Paris. He is interred in the Père Lachaise Cemetery in Paris with a tomb sculpted by his student Jean-Marie Bonnassieux. The contents of his studio, including a number of major paintings, over 4000 drawings, and his violin, were bequeathed by the artist to the city museum of Montauban, now known as the Musée Ingres.

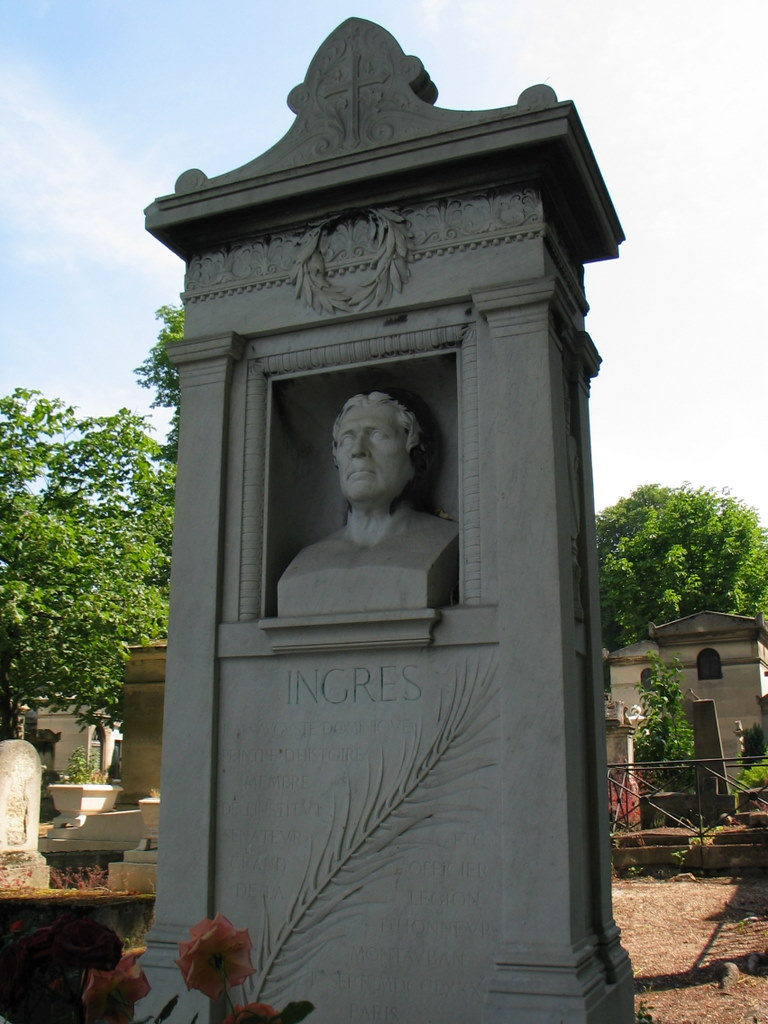
Tomb of Ingres in the Père Lachaise Cemetery, Paris

== Style ==
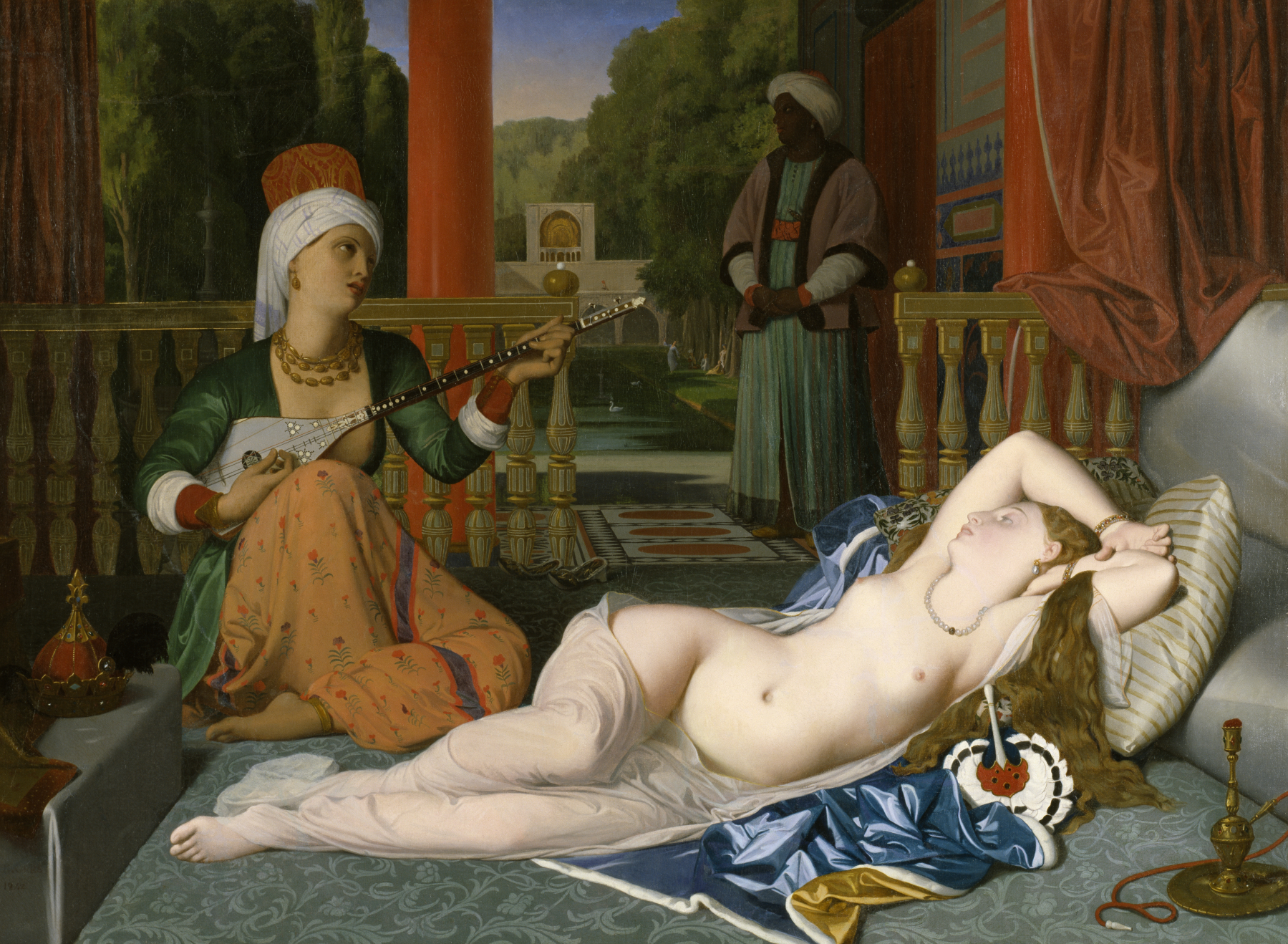
Odalisque with Slave (1842), oil on canvas, 76 x 105 cm, Walters Art Gallery, Baltimore

Ingres's style was formed early in life and changed comparatively little. His earliest drawings, such as the Portrait of a Man (or Portrait of an unknown, 3 July 1797, now in the Louvre) already show a suavity of outline and an extraordinary control of the parallel hatchings which model the forms. From the first, his paintings are characterized by a firmness of outline reflecting his often-quoted conviction that "drawing is the probity of art". He believed colour to be no more than an accessory to drawing, explaining: "Drawing is not just reproducing contours, it is not just the line; drawing is also the expression, the inner form, the composition, the modelling. See what is left after that. Drawing is seven eighths of what makes up painting."

The art historian Jean Clay said Ingres "proceeded always from certitude to certitude, with the result that even his freest sketches reveal the same kind of execution as that found in the final works." In depicting the human body he disregarded rules of anatomy—which he termed a "dreadful science that I cannot think of without disgust"—in his quest for a sinuous arabesque. Abhorring the visible brushstroke, Ingres made no recourse to the shifting effects of colour and light on which the Romantic school depended; he preferred local colours only faintly modelled in light by half tones. "Ce que l'on sait," he would repeat, "il faut le savoir l'épée à la main." ("Whatever you know, you must know it with sword in hand.") Ingres thus left himself without the means of producing the necessary unity of effect when dealing with crowded compositions, such as the Apotheosis of Homer and the Martyrdom of Saint Symphorian. Among Ingres's historical and mythological paintings, the most satisfactory are usually those depicting one or two figures, such as Oedipus, The Half-Length Bather, Odalisque, and The Spring, subjects only animated by the consciousness of perfect physical well-being.

In Roger Freeing Angelica, the female nude seems merely juxtaposed with the meticulously rendered but inert figure of Roger flying to the rescue on his hippogriff, for Ingres was rarely successful in the depiction of movement and drama. According to Sanford Schwartz, the "historical, mythological, and religious pictures bespeak huge amounts of energy and industry, but, conveying little palpable sense of inner tension, are costume dramas ... The faces in the history pictures are essentially those of models waiting for the session to be over. When an emotion is to be expressed, it comes across stridently, or woodenly."

Ingres was averse to theories, and his allegiance to classicism—with its emphasis on the ideal, the generalized, and the regular—was tempered by his love of the particular. He believed that "the secret of beauty has to be found through truth. The ancients did not create, they did not make; they recognized." In many of Ingres's works there is a collision between the idealized and the particular that creates what Robert Rosenblum termed an "oil-and-water sensation". This contradiction is vivid in Cherubini and the Muse of Lyric Poetry (1842), for example, in which the realistically painted 81-year-old composer is attended by an idealized muse in classical drapery.

Ingres's choice of subjects reflected his literary tastes, which were severely limited: he read and reread Homer, Virgil, Plutarch, Dante, histories, and the lives of the artists. Throughout his life he revisited a small number of favourite themes, and painted multiple versions of many of his major compositions. He did not share his age's enthusiasm for battle scenes, and generally preferred to depict "moments of revelation or intimate decision manifested by meeting or confrontation, but never by violence." His numerous odalisque paintings were influenced to a great extent by the writings of Mary Wortley Montagu, the wife of the ambassador to Turkey whose diaries and letters, when published, fascinated European society.

Although capable of painting quickly, he often laboured for years over a painting. Ingres's pupil Amaury-Duval wrote of him: "With this facility of execution, one has trouble explaining why Ingres' oeuvre is not still larger, but he scraped out [his work] frequently, never being satisfied ... and perhaps this facility itself made him rework whatever dissatisfied him, certain that he had the power to repair the fault, and quickly, too." Ingres's Venus Anadyomene was begun in 1807 but not completed until 1848, after a long hiatus resulting from his indecision about the position of the arms. The Source (1856) had a similar history. It was begun in the 1820s as a sketch of "such simplicity that one would suppose she had been painted in a single stroke" according to Amaury-Duval, who believed that Ingres' reworking of the painting in 1855 was a loss.

=== Portraits ===
Portrait of Marie-Françoise Rivière (1805–06), oil on canvas, 116.5 x 81.7 cm, Louvre

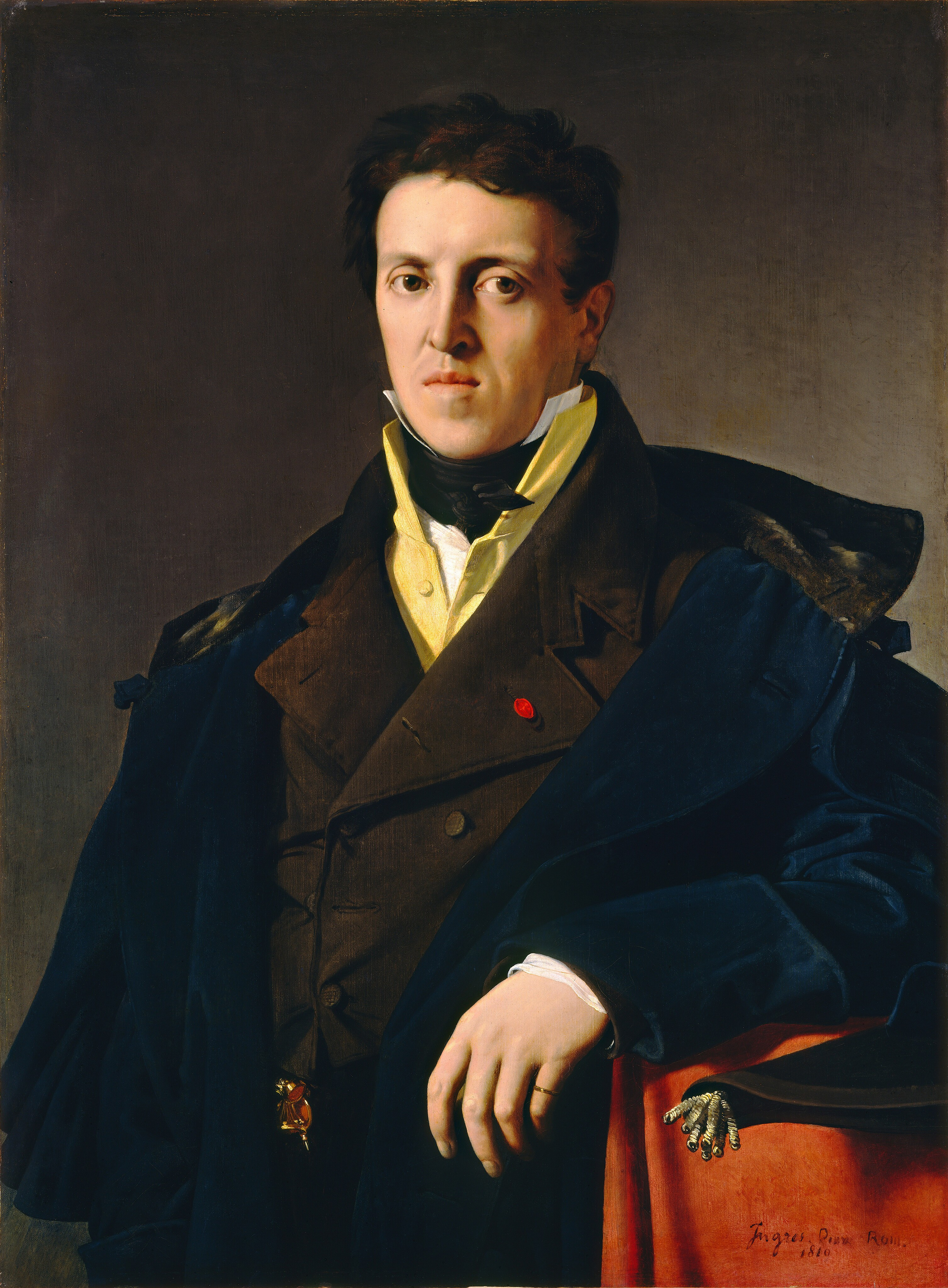
Portrait of Charles Marcotte (1810), National Gallery of Art, Washington DC

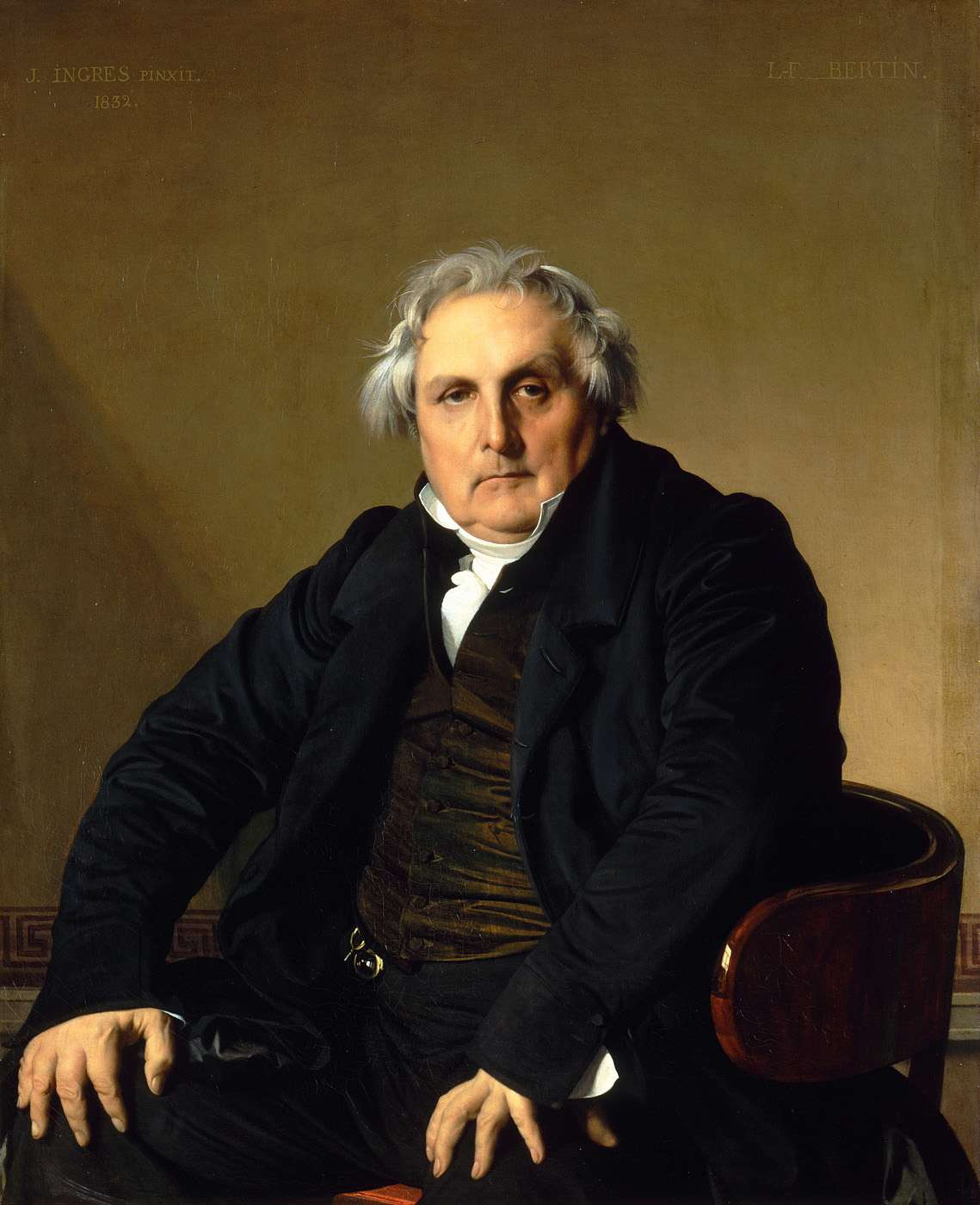
Portrait of Monsieur Bertin (1832), the Louvre

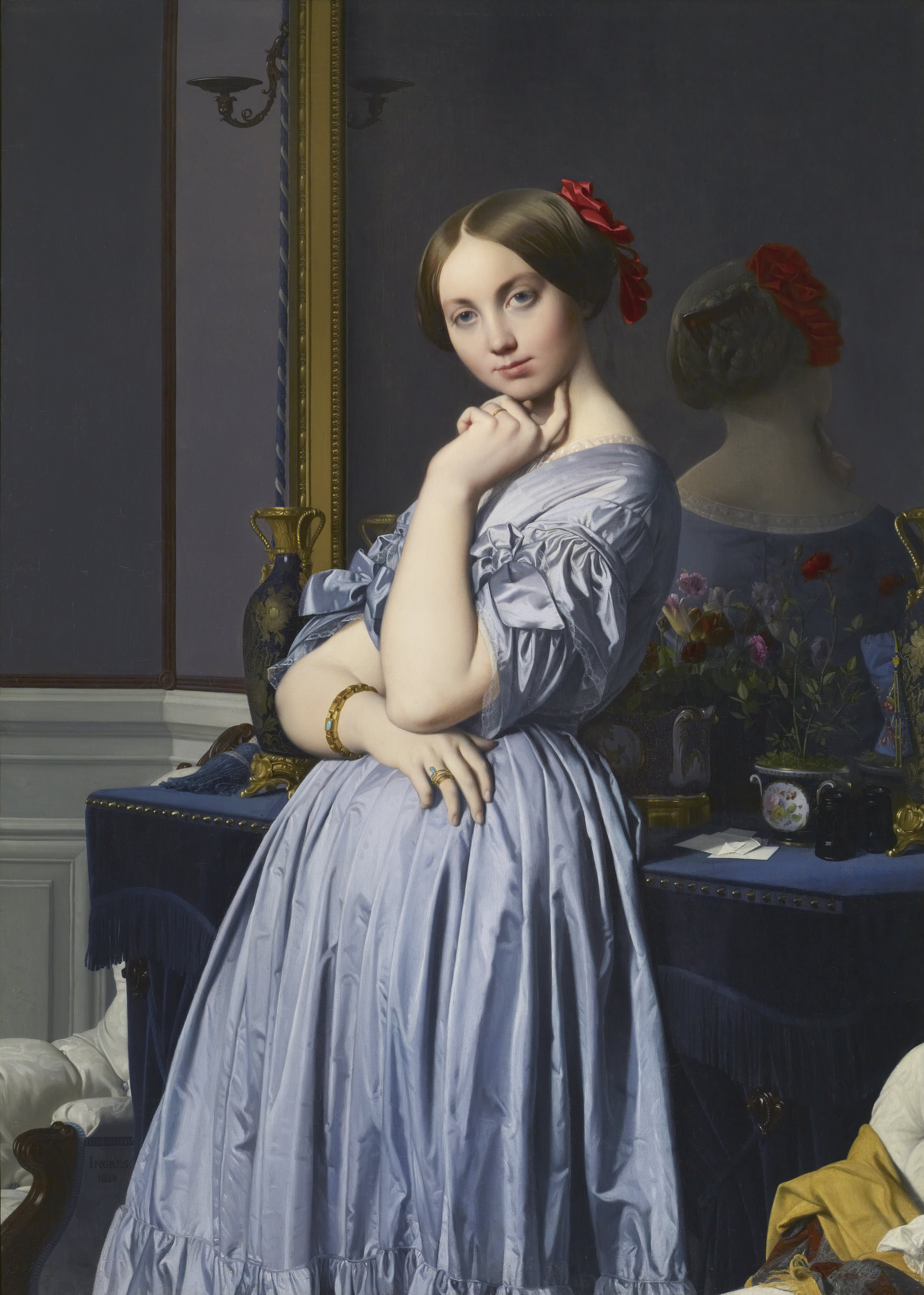
Portrait of Comtesse d'Haussonville (1845), Frick Collection, New York

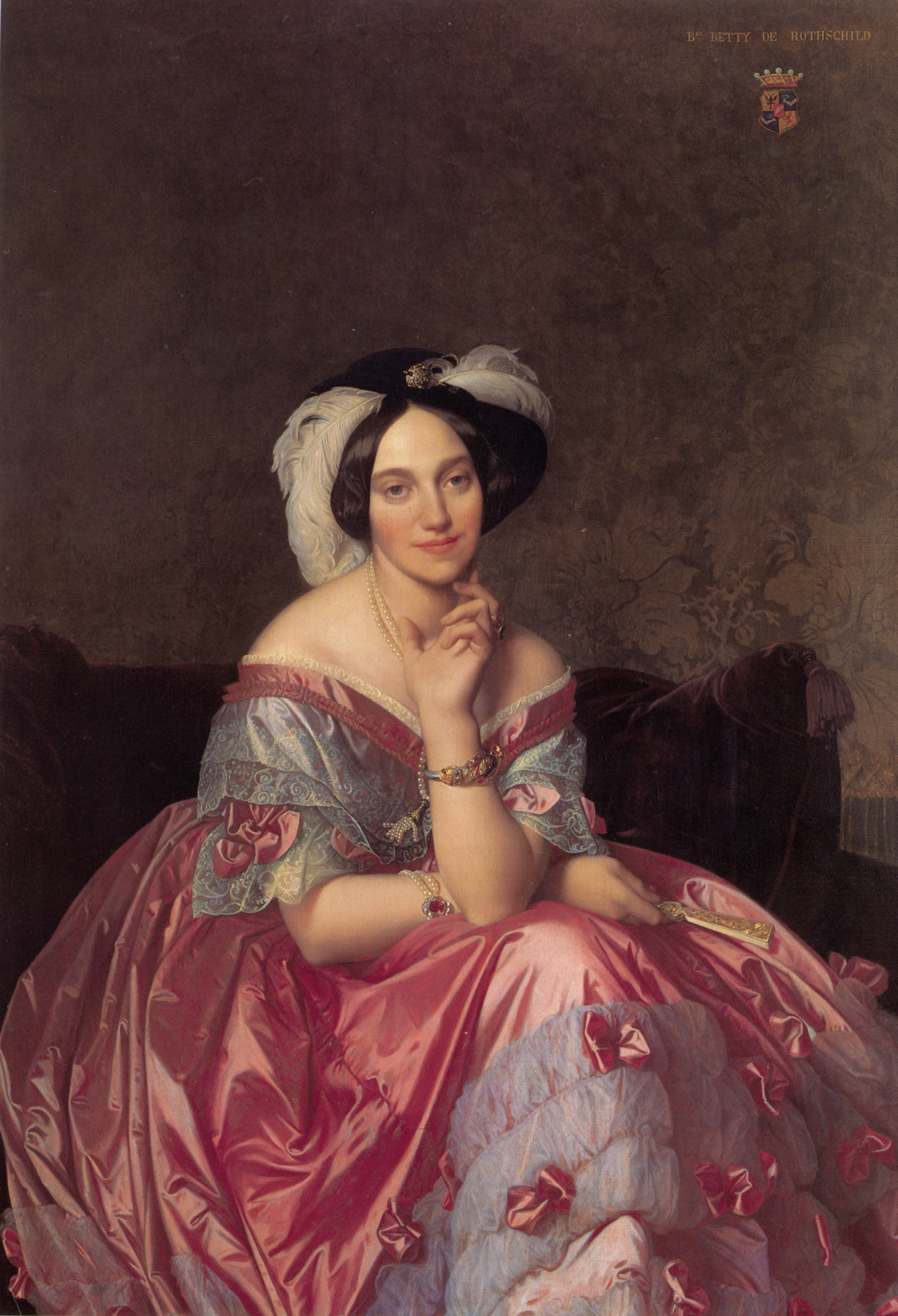
Portrait of Baronne de Rothschild (1848), Rothschild Collection, Paris

While Ingres believed that history painting was the highest form of art, his modern reputation rests largely upon the exceptional quality of his portraits. By the time of his retrospective at the Exposition Universelle in 1855, an emerging consensus viewed his portrait paintings as his masterpieces. Their consistently high quality belies Ingres's often-stated complaint that the demands of portraiture robbed him of time he could have spent painting historical subjects. Baudelaire called him "the sole man in France who truly makes portraits. The portraits of M. Bertin, M. Molé and Mme d'Haussonville are true portraits, that is, the ideal reconstruction of individuals....A good portrait seems to me always as a biography dramatized." His most famous portrait is that of Louis-François Bertin, the chief editor of the Journal des Debats, which was widely admired when it was exhibited at the 1833 Salon. Ingres had originally planned to paint Bertin standing, but many hours of effort ended in a creative impasse before he decided on a seated pose. Édouard Manet described the resulting portrait as "The Buddha of the Bourgeoisie". The portrait quickly became a symbol of the rising economic and political power of Bertin's social class.

For his female portraits, he often posed the subject after a classical statue; the famous portrait of the Comtesse de'Haussonville may have been modeled after a Roman statue called "Pudicity" ("modesty") in the Vatican collection. Another trick that Ingres used was to paint the fabrics and details in the portraits with extreme precision and accuracy, but to idealize the face. The eye of the viewer would perceive the fabrics as realistic and would assume the face was equally true. His portraits of women range from the warmly sensuous Madame de Senonnes (1814) to the realistic Mademoiselle Jeanne Gonin (1821), the Junoesque Marie-Clothilde-Inés de Foucauld, Madame Moitessier (portrayed standing and seated, 1851 and 1856), and the chilly Joséphine-Eléonore-Marie-Pauline de Galard de Brassac de Béarn, Princesse de Broglie (1853).

=== Drawings ===
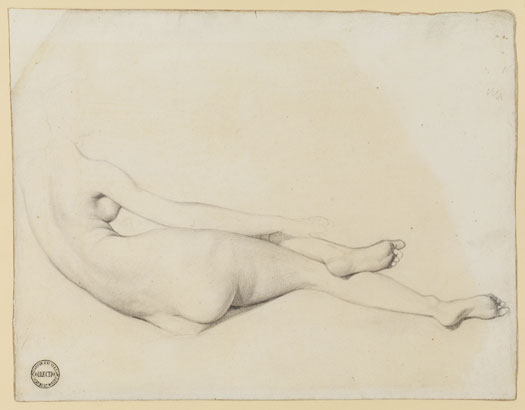
Study for the Grande Odalisque (1814)

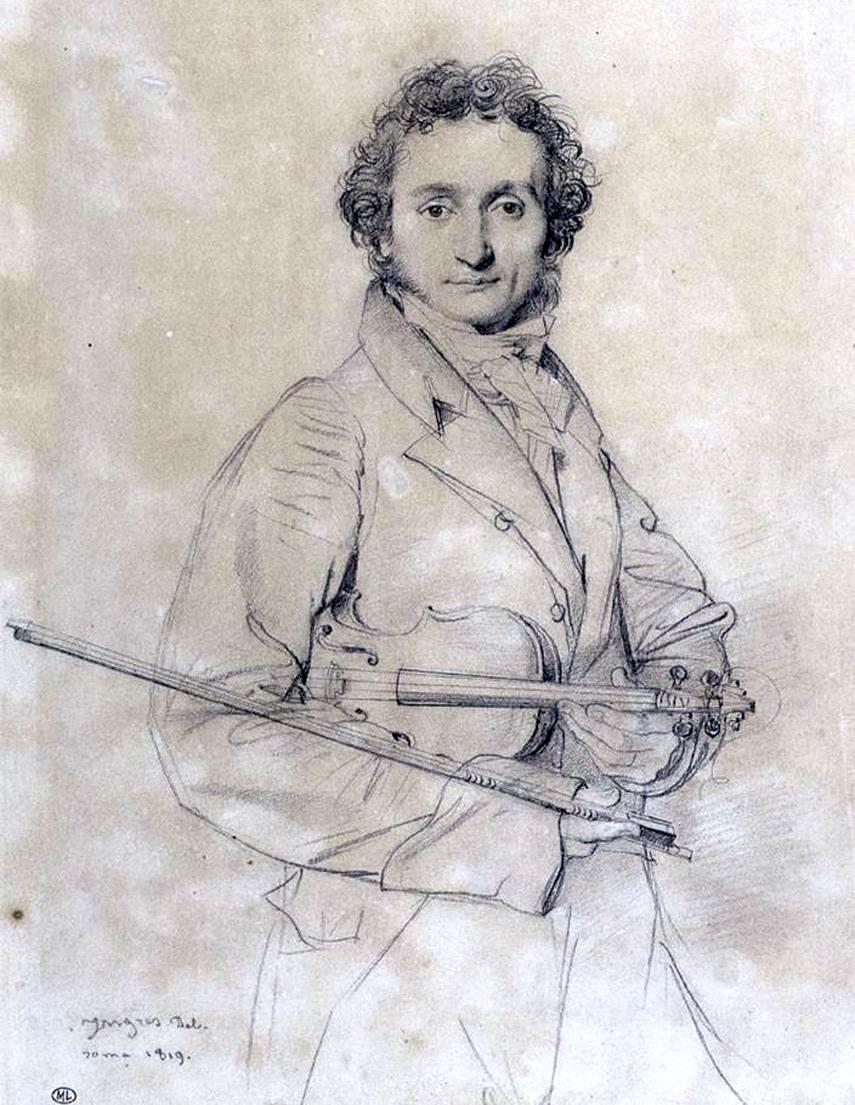
The violinist Niccolo Paganini (1819)

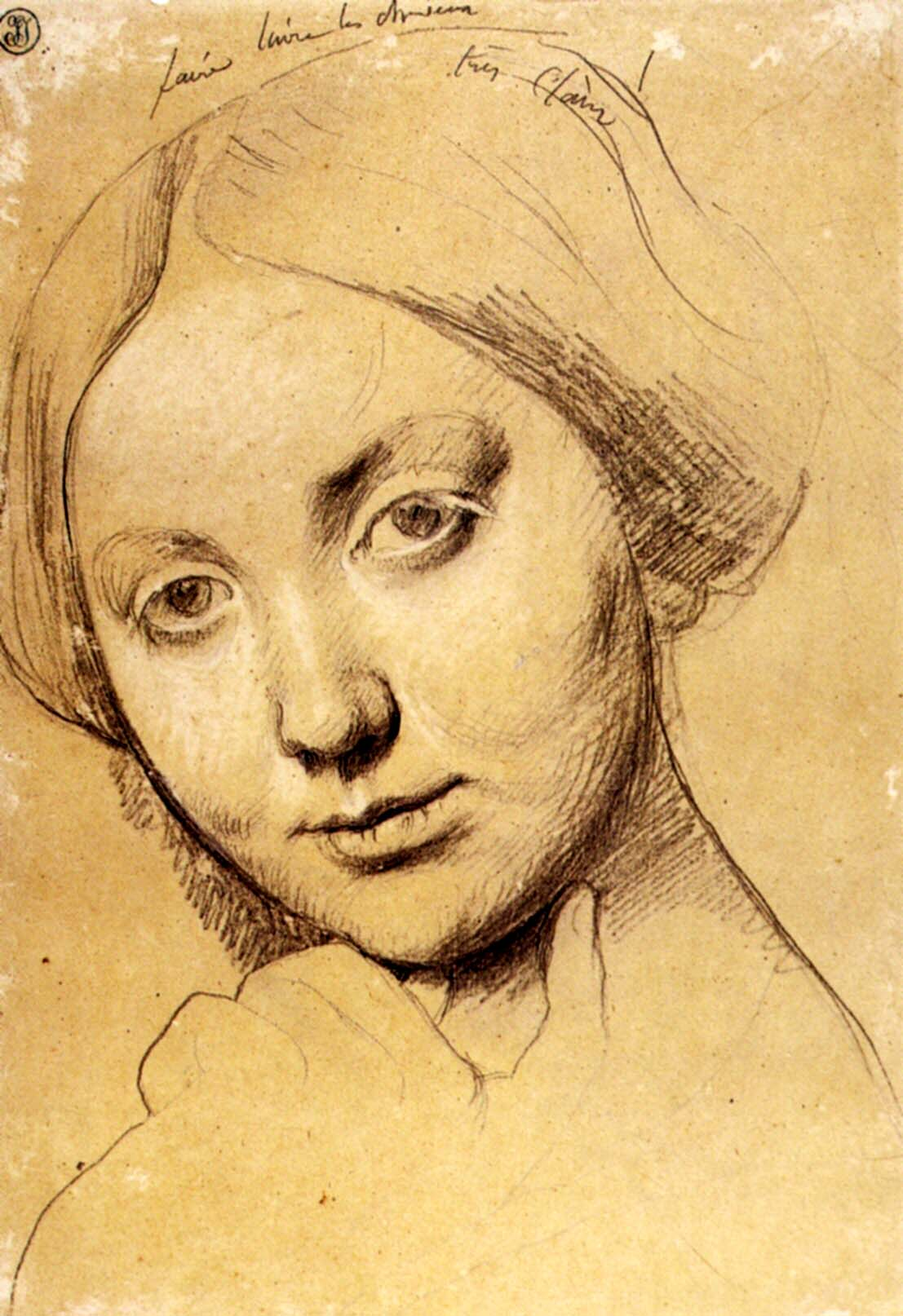
Study for the portrait of the Vicomtesse d'Haussonville (circa 1844)

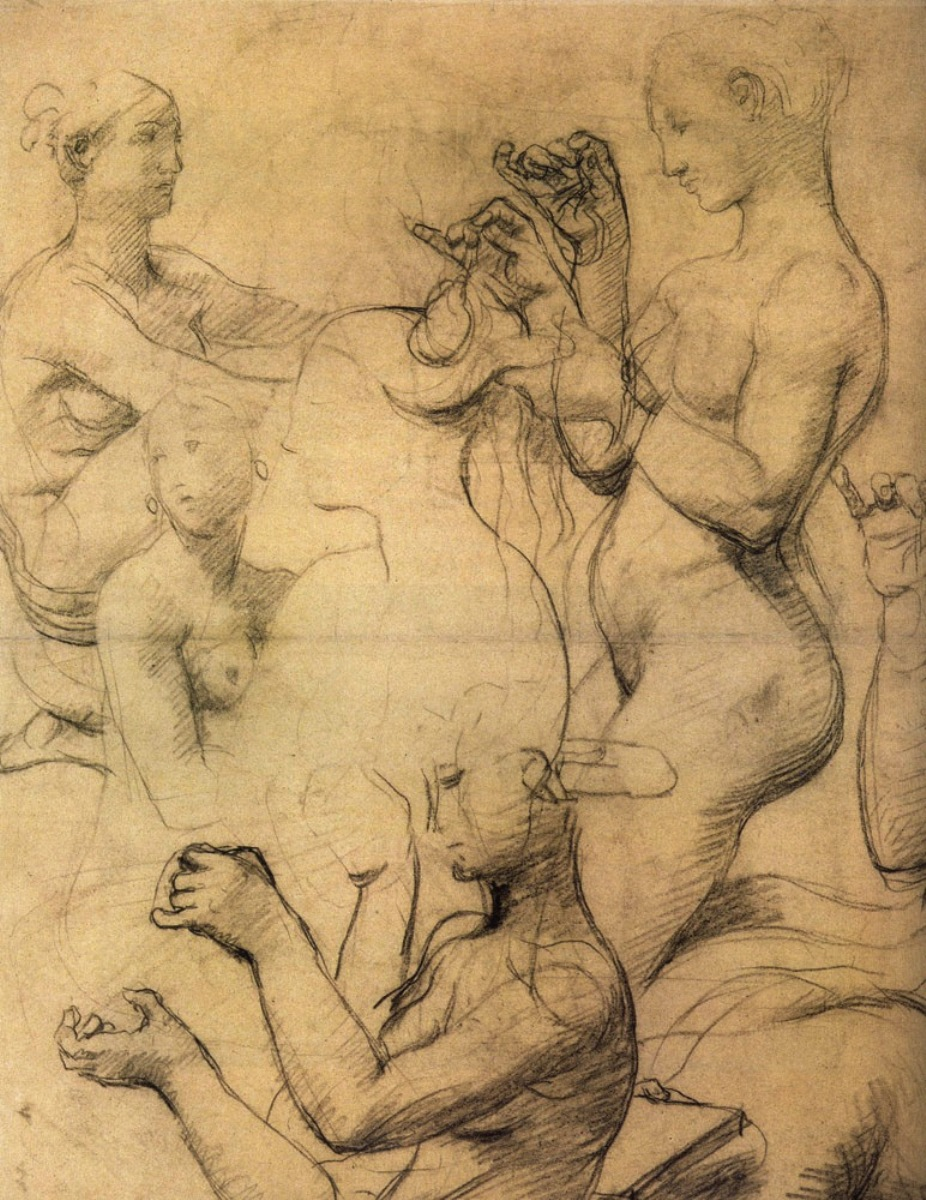
Study for The Turkish Bath (1859)

Drawing was the foundation of Ingres's art. In the Ecole des Beaux-Arts he excelled at figure drawing, winning the top prizes. During his years in Rome and Florence, he made hundreds of drawings of family, friends, and visitors, many of them of very high portrait quality. He never began a painting without first resolving the drawing, usually with a long series of drawing in which he refined the composition. In the case of his large history paintings, each figure in the painting was the subject of numerous sketches and studies as he tried different poses. He demanded that his students at the Academy and the Ecole des Beaux-Arts perfect their drawing before anything else; he declared that a "thing well drawn is always a thing well painted".

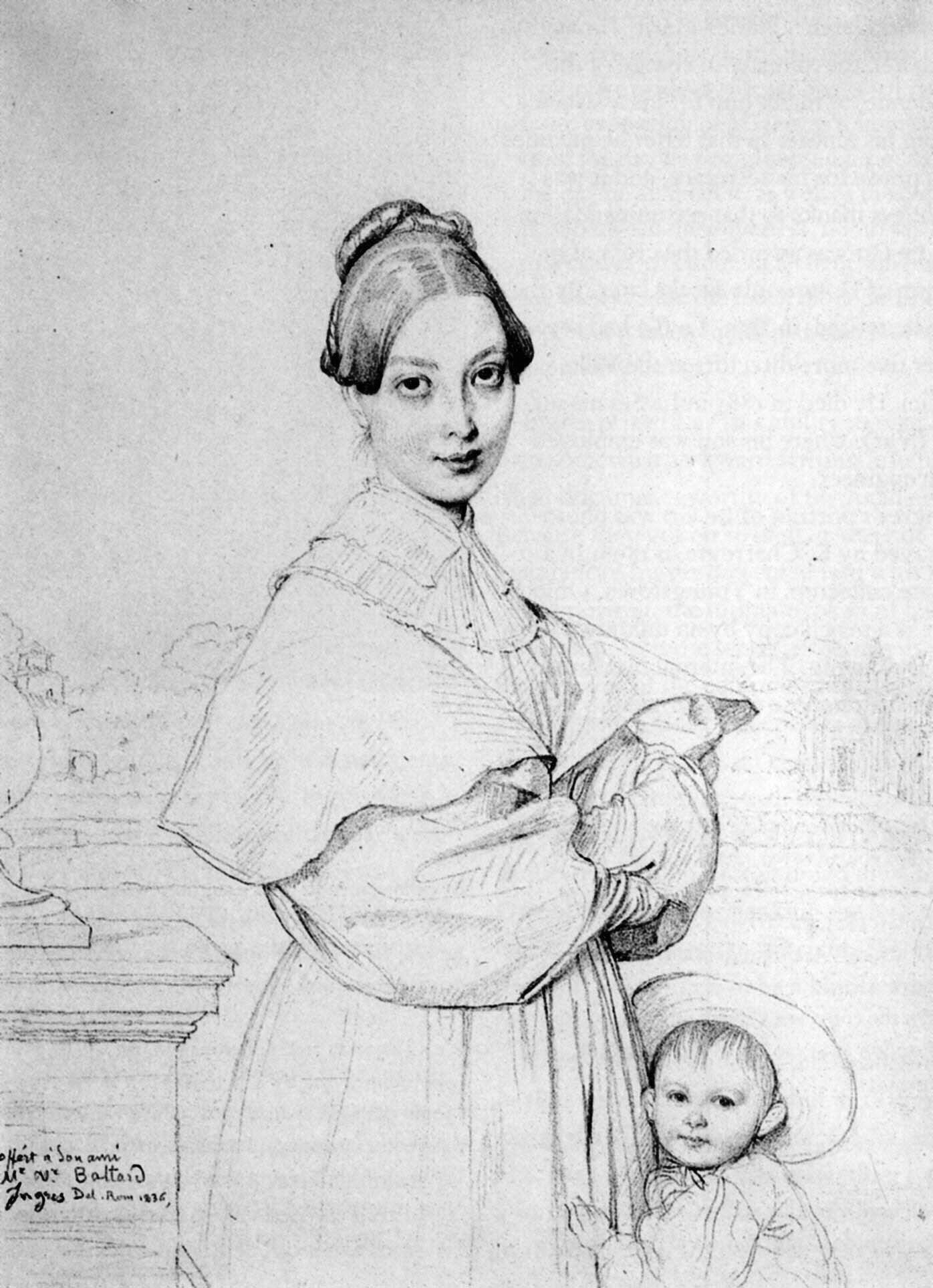
Mme Victor Baltard and Her Daughter, Paule, 1836, pencil on paper, 30.1 x 22.3 cm

His portrait drawings, of which about 450 are extant, are today among his most admired works. While a disproportionate number of them date from his difficult early years in Italy, he continued to produce portrait drawings of his friends until the end of his life. Agnes Mongan has written of the portrait drawings:

Before his departure in the fall of 1806 from Paris for Rome, the familiar characteristics of his drawing style were well established, the delicate yet firm contour, the definite yet discreet distortions of form, the almost uncanny capacity to seize a likeness in the precise yet lively delineation of features.

The preferred materials were also already established: the sharply pointed graphite pencil on a smooth white paper. So familiar to us are both the materials and the manner that we forget how extraordinary they must have seemed at the time ... Ingres' manner of drawing was as new as the century. It was immediately recognized as expert and admirable. If his paintings were sternly criticized as "Gothic", no comparable criticism was leveled at his drawings.

His student Raymond Balze described Ingres's working routine in executing his portrait drawings, each of which required four hours, as "an hour and a half in the morning, then two-and-a-half hours in the afternoon, he very rarely retouched it the next day. He often told me that he got the essence of the portrait while lunching with the model who, off guard, became more natural." The resulting drawings, according to John Canaday, revealed the sitters' personalities by means so subtle—and so free of cruelty—that Ingres could "expose the vanities of a fop, a silly woman, or a windbag, in drawings that delighted them."

Ingres drew his portrait drawings on wove paper, which provided a smooth surface very different from the ribbed surface of laid paper (which is, nevertheless, sometimes referred to today as "Ingres paper"). The early drawings are characterized by very taut contours drawn with sharply pointed graphite, while later drawings show freer lines and more emphatic modeling, drawn with a softer, blunter graphite.

Drawings made in preparation for paintings, such as the many studies for The Martyrdom of St. Symphorian and The Golden Age, are more varied in size and treatment than are the portrait drawings. It was his usual practice to make many drawings of nude models, in search of the most eloquent gesture, before making another series of drawings for the draperies. In his early years he sometimes had his model pose behind a translucent veil that suppressed details and emphasized the arabesque. He often used female models when testing poses for male figures, as he did in drawings for Jesus Among the Doctors. Nude studies exist even for some of his commissioned portraits, but these were drawn using hired models.

Ingres drew a number of landscape views while in Rome, but he painted only one pure landscape, the small tondo Raphael's Casino (although two other small landscape tondos are sometimes attributed to him).

=== Colour ===
For Ingres, colour played an entirely secondary role in art. He wrote, "Colour adds ornament to a painting; but it is nothing but the handmaiden, because all it does is to render more agreeable the true perfections of the art. Rubens and Van Dyck can be pleasing at first sight, but they are deceptive; they are from the poor school of colourists, the school of deception. Never use bright colours, they are anti-historic. It is better to fall into gray than to into bright colours." The Institute in Paris complained in 1838 that the students of Ingres in Rome "had a deplorable lack of knowledge of the truth and power of colour, and a knowledge of the different effects of light. A dull and opaque effect is found in all their canvases. They seem to have only been lit by twilight." The poet and critic Baudelaire observed: "the students of M. Ingres have very uselessly avoided any semblance of colour; they believe or pretend to believe that they are not needed in painting."

Ingres's own paintings vary considerably in their use of colour, and critics were apt to fault them as too grey or, contrarily, too jarring. Baudelaire—who said "M. Ingres adores colour like a fashionable milliner"—wrote of the portraits of Louis-François Bertin and Madame d'Haussonville: "Open your eyes, nation of simpletons, and tell us if you ever saw such dazzling, eye-catching painting, or even a greater elaboration of colour". Ingres's paintings are often characterized by strong local colours, such as the "acid blues and bottle greens" Kenneth Clark professed to "perversely enjoy" in La Grande Odalisque. In other works, especially in his less formal portraits such as the Mademoiselle Jeanne-Suzanne-Catherine Gonin (1821), colour is restrained.

== Ingres and Delacroix ==
Ingres and Delacroix became, in the mid-19th century, the most prominent representatives of the two competing schools of art in France, neoclassicism and romanticism. Neo-classicism was based in large part on the philosophy of Johann Joachim Winckelmann (1717–1768), who wrote that art should embody "noble simplicity and calm grandeur". Many painters followed this course, including François Gérard, Antoine-Jean Gros, Anne-Louis Girodet, and Jacques-Louis David, the teacher of Ingres. A competing school, romanticism, emerged first in Germany, and moved quickly to France. It rejected the idea of the imitation of classical styles, which it described as "gothic" and "primitive". The Romanticists in French painting were led by Théodore Géricault and especially Delacroix. The rivalry first emerged at the Paris Salon of 1824, where Ingres exhibited The Vow of Louis XIII, inspired by Raphael, while Delacroix showed The Massacre at Chios, depicting a tragic event in the Greek War of Independence. Ingres's painting was calm, static and carefully constructed, while the work of Delacroix was turbulent, full of motion, colour, and emotion.

The dispute between the two painters and schools reappeared at the 1827 Salon, where Ingres presented L'Apotheose d'Homer, an example of classical balance and harmony, while Delacroix showed The Death of Sardanapalus, another glittering and tumultuous scene of violence. The duel between the two painters, each considered the best of his school, continued over the years. Paris artists and intellectuals were passionately divided by the conflict, although modern art historians tend to regard Ingres and other Neoclassicists as embodying the Romantic spirit of their time.

At the 1855 Universal Exposition, both Delacroix and Ingres were well represented. The supporters of Delacroix and the romantics heaped abuse on the work of Ingres. The Brothers Goncourt described "the miserly talent" of Ingres: "Faced with history, M. Ingres calls vainly to his assistance a certain wisdom, decency, convenience, correction and a reasonable dose of the spiritual elevation that a graduate of a college demands. He scatters persons around the center of the action ... tosses here and there an arm, a leg, a head perfectly drawn, and thinks that his job is done..."

Baudelaire also, previously sympathetic toward Ingres, shifted toward Delacroix. "M. Ingres can be considered a man gifted with high qualities, an eloquent evoker of beauty, but deprived of the energetic temperament which creates the fatality of genius."

Delacroix himself was merciless toward Ingres. Describing the exhibition of works by Ingres at the 1855 Exposition, he called it "ridiculous ... presented, as one knows, in a rather pompous fashion ... It is the complete expression of an incomplete intelligence; effort and pretension are everywhere; nowhere is there found a spark of the natural."

According to Ingres' student Paul Chenavard, later in their careers, Ingres and Delacroix accidentally met on the steps of the French Institute; Ingres put his hand out, and the two shook amicably.

== Pupils ==
Ingres was a conscientious teacher and was greatly admired by his students. The best known of them is Théodore Chassériau, who studied with him from 1830, as a precocious eleven-year-old, until Ingres closed his studio in 1834 to return to Rome. Ingres considered Chassériau his truest disciple—even predicting, according to an early biographer, that he would be "the Napoleon of painting".

By the time Chassériau visited Ingres in Rome in 1840, however, the younger artist's growing allegiance to the romantic style of Delacroix was apparent, leading Ingres to disown his favourite student, of whom he subsequently spoke rarely and censoriously. No other artist who studied under Ingres succeeded in establishing a strong identity; among the most notable of them were Jean-Hippolyte Flandrin, Henri Lehmann, and Eugène Emmanuel Amaury-Duval.

== Influence on modern art ==
Pablo Picasso, Portrait of Gertrude Stein, 1906. Metropolitan Museum of Art, New York

Ingres's influence on later generations of artists was considerable. One of his heirs was Degas, who studied under Louis Lamothe, a minor disciple of Ingres. In the 20th century, his influence was even stronger. Picasso and Matisse were among those who acknowledged a debt to Ingres; Matisse described him as the first painter "to use pure colours, outlining them without distorting them." The startling effects of Ingres's paintings—the collapsing of traditional depth and perspective and the presentation of figures "like the figures in a deck of cards"—were criticized in the 19th century but were welcomed by the avant-garde in the 20th century. An important retrospective of works by Ingres was held at the Salon d'automne in Paris in 1905, which was visited by Picasso, Matisse, and many other artists. The original and striking composition of The Turkish Bath, shown for the first time in public, had a visible influence on the composition and poses of the figures in Picasso's Les Demoiselles d'Avignon in 1907. The exhibit also included many of his studies for the unfinished mural l'Age d'or, including a striking drawing of women gracefully dancing in a circle. Matisse produced his own version on this composition in his painting La Danse in 1909. The particular pose and colouring of Ingres's Portrait of Monsieur Bertin also made a reappearance in Picasso's Portrait of Gertrude Stein (1906).

Barnett Newman credited Ingres as a progenitor of abstract expressionism, explaining: "That guy was an abstract painter ... He looked at the canvas more often than at the model. Kline, de Kooning—none of us would have existed without him."

Les Demoiselles d'Avignon, Pablo Picasso (1907)

Pierre Barousse, the curator of the Musée Ingres, wrote:

...One realizes in how many ways a variety of artists claim him as their master, from the most plainly conventional of the nineteenth century such as Cabanel or Bouguereau, to the most revolutionary of our century from Matisse to Picasso. A classicist? Above all, he was moved by the impulse to penetrate the secret of natural beauty and to reinterpret it through its own means; an attitude fundamentally different to that of David ... there results a truly personal and unique art admired as much by the Cubists for its plastic autonomy, as by the Surrealists for its visionary qualities.

Ingres is one of the most cited artists in the interpictural compositions of the Peruvian painter Herman Braun-Vega. The latter dedicated an entire exhibition to him in 2006 on the occasion of the year dedicated to Ingres in France museums.

== Violon d'Ingres ==
Ingres's well-known passion for playing the violin gave rise to a common expression in the French language, "violon d'Ingres", meaning a second skill beyond the one by which a person is mainly known.

Ingres was an amateur violin player from his youth, and played for a time as second violinist for the orchestra of Toulouse. When he was Director of the French Academy in Rome, he played frequently with the music students and guest artists. Charles Gounod, who was a student under Ingres at the Academy, merely noted that "he was not a professional, even less a virtuoso". Along with the student musicians, he performed Beethoven string quartets with Niccolò Paganini. In an 1839 letter, Franz Liszt described his playing as "charming", and planned to play through all the Mozart and Beethoven violin sonatas with Ingres. Liszt also dedicated his transcriptions of the 5th and 6th symphonies of Beethoven to Ingres on their original publication in 1840.

The American avant-garde artist Man Ray used this expression as the title of a famous photograph portraying Alice Prin (aka Kiki de Montparnasse) in the pose of the Valpinçon Bather with two f-holes painted on to make her body resemble a violin.

== Gallery ==
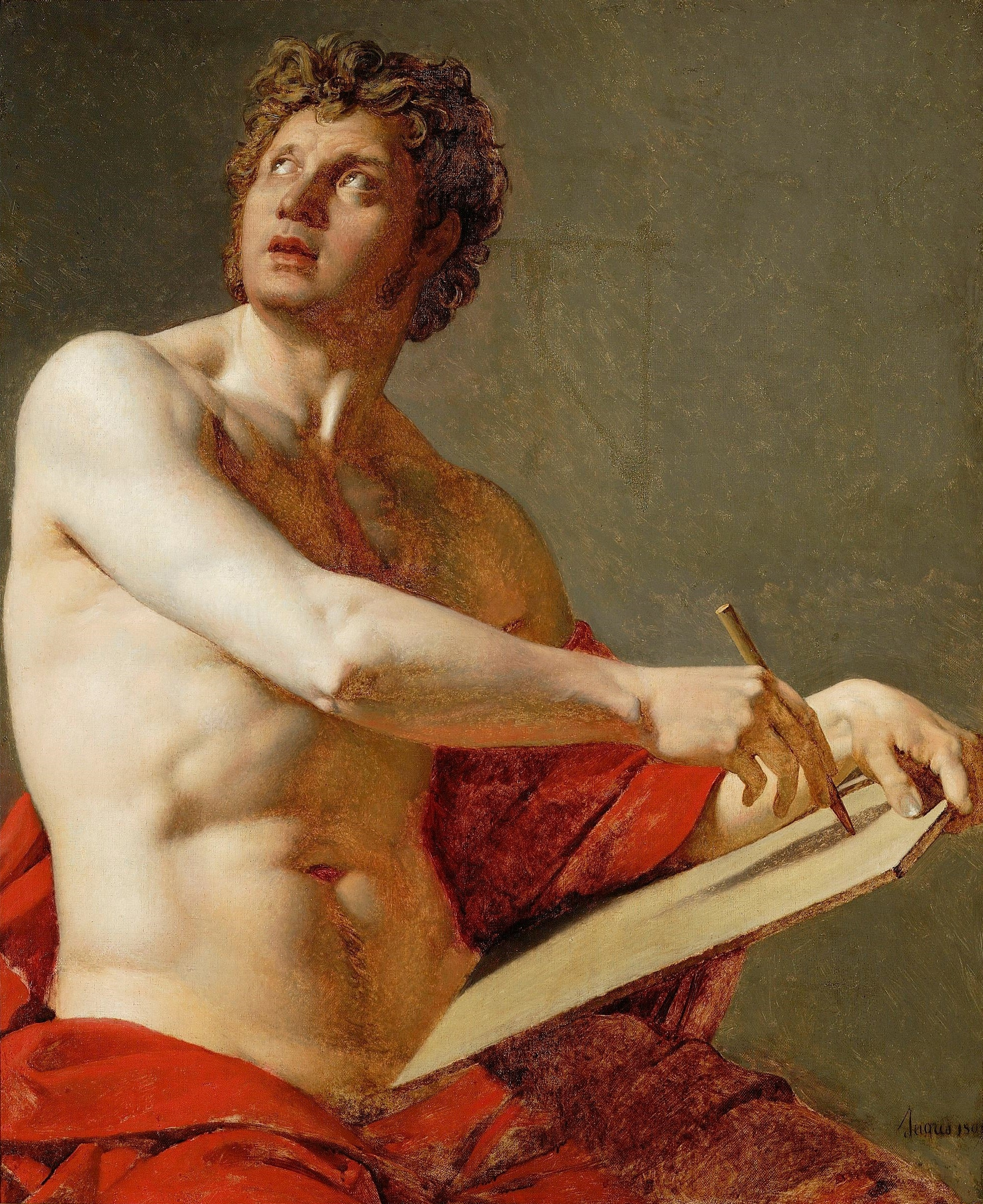
Academic Study of a Male Torso, 1801, National Museum in Warsaw

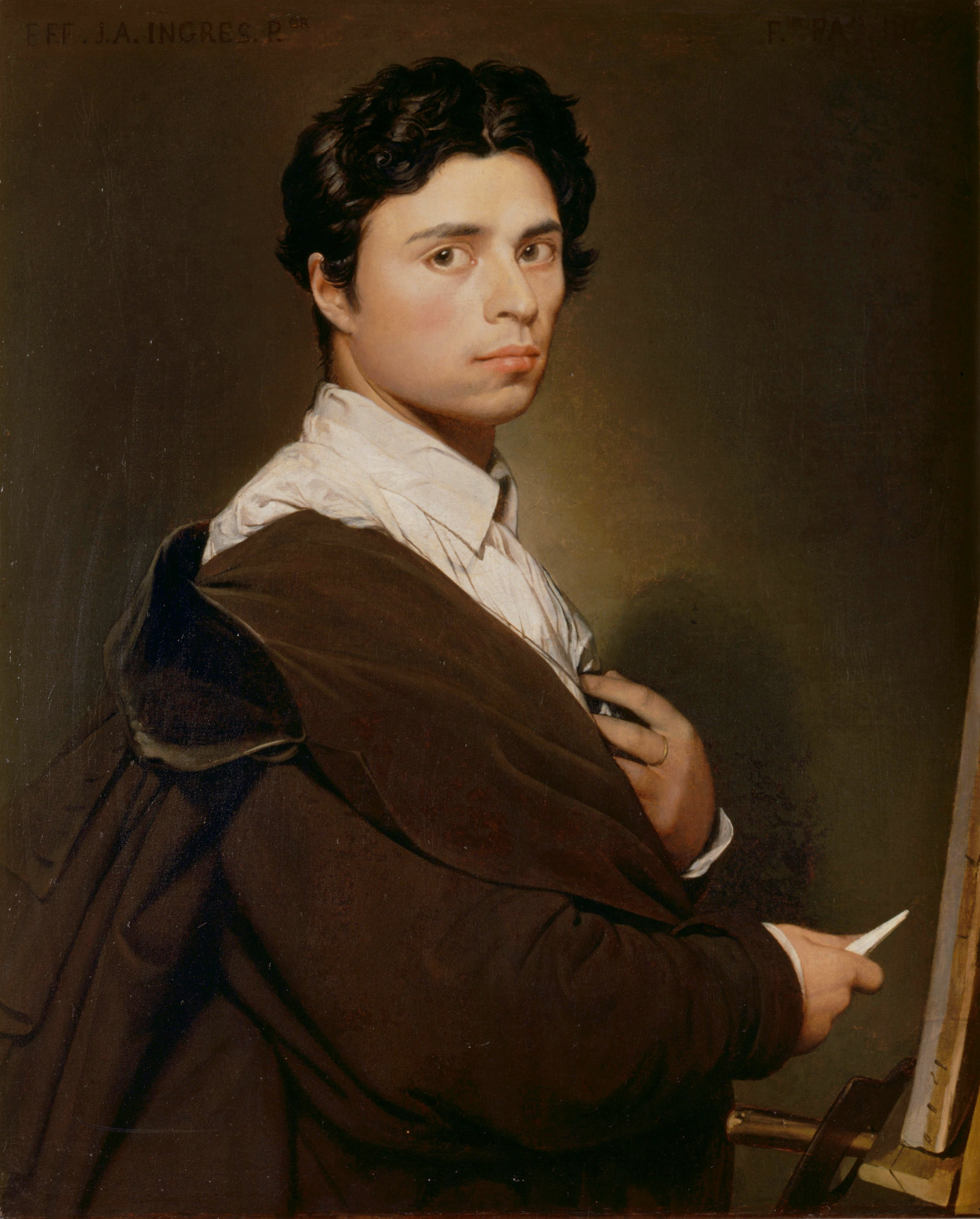
Self-Portrait, 1804, revised c. 1850, Musée Condé, Chantilly

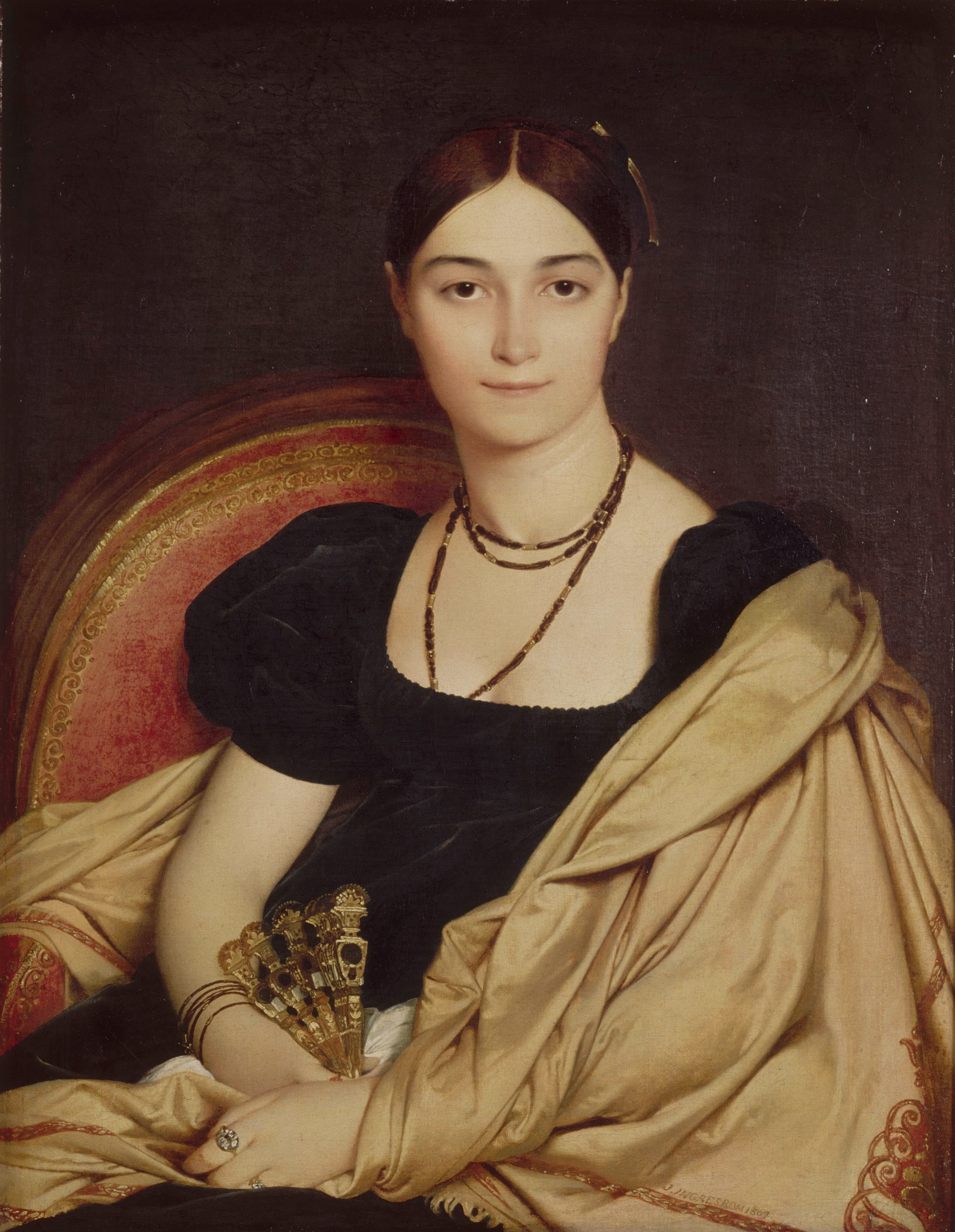
Madame Duvaucey, 1807, Musée Condé, Chantilly

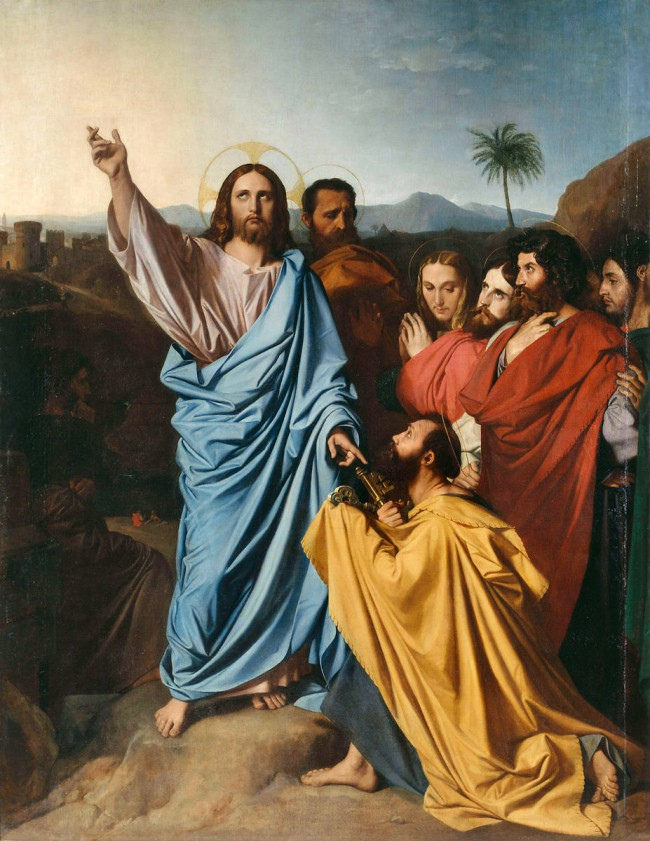
Jesus Returning the Keys to St. Peter, 1820

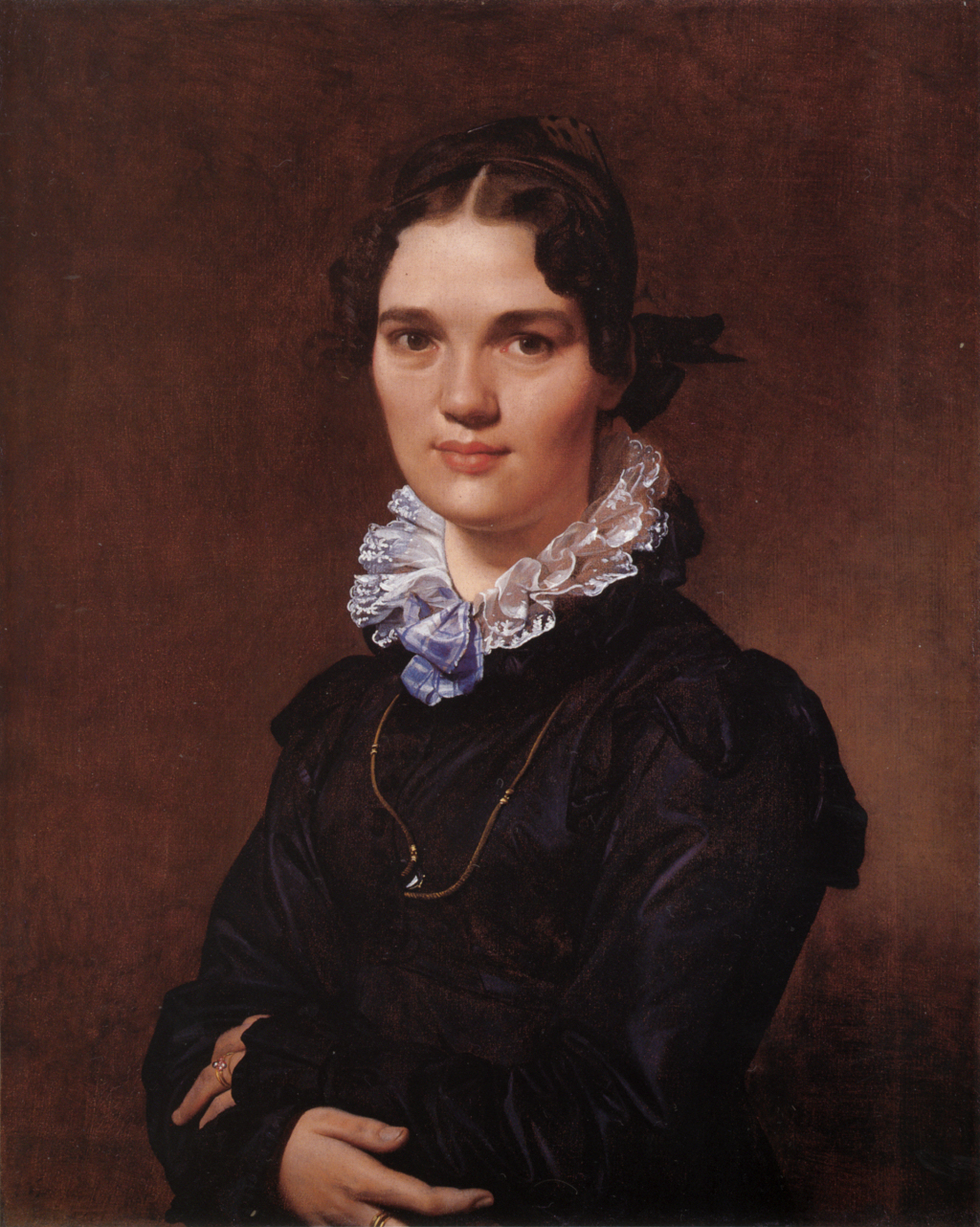
Mademoiselle Jeanne-Suzanne-Catherine Gonin, 1821, Taft Museum of Art

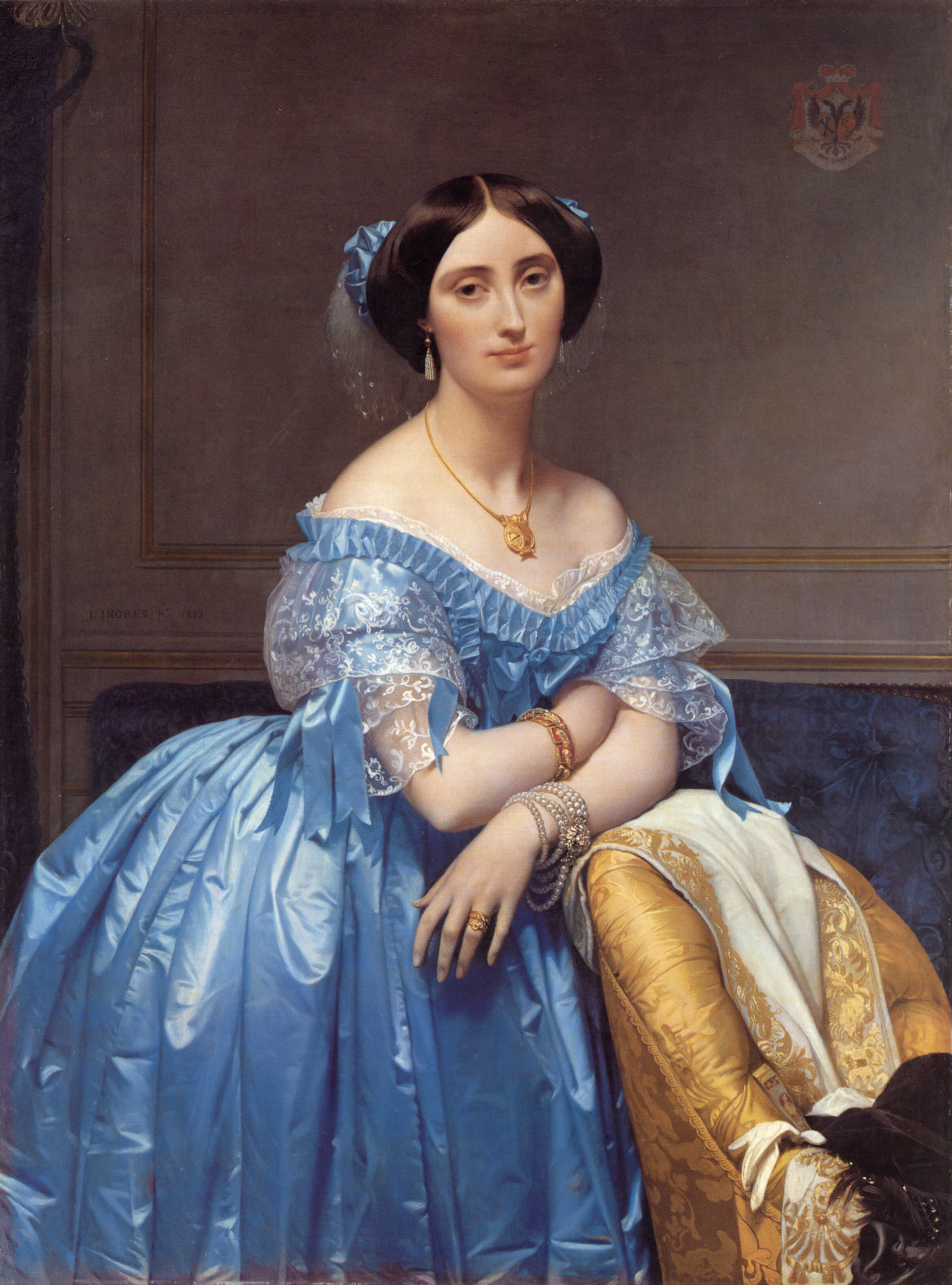
The Princesse de Broglie, née Joséphine-Eléonore-Marie-Pauline de Galard de Brassac de Béarn, 1853, Metropolitan Museum of Art, New York

Joan of Arc at the Coronation of Charles VII, 1854, Louvre

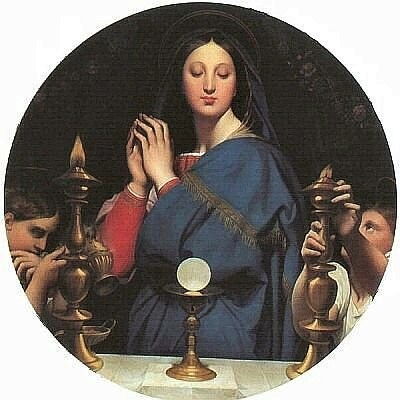
The Virgin of the Host, 1854

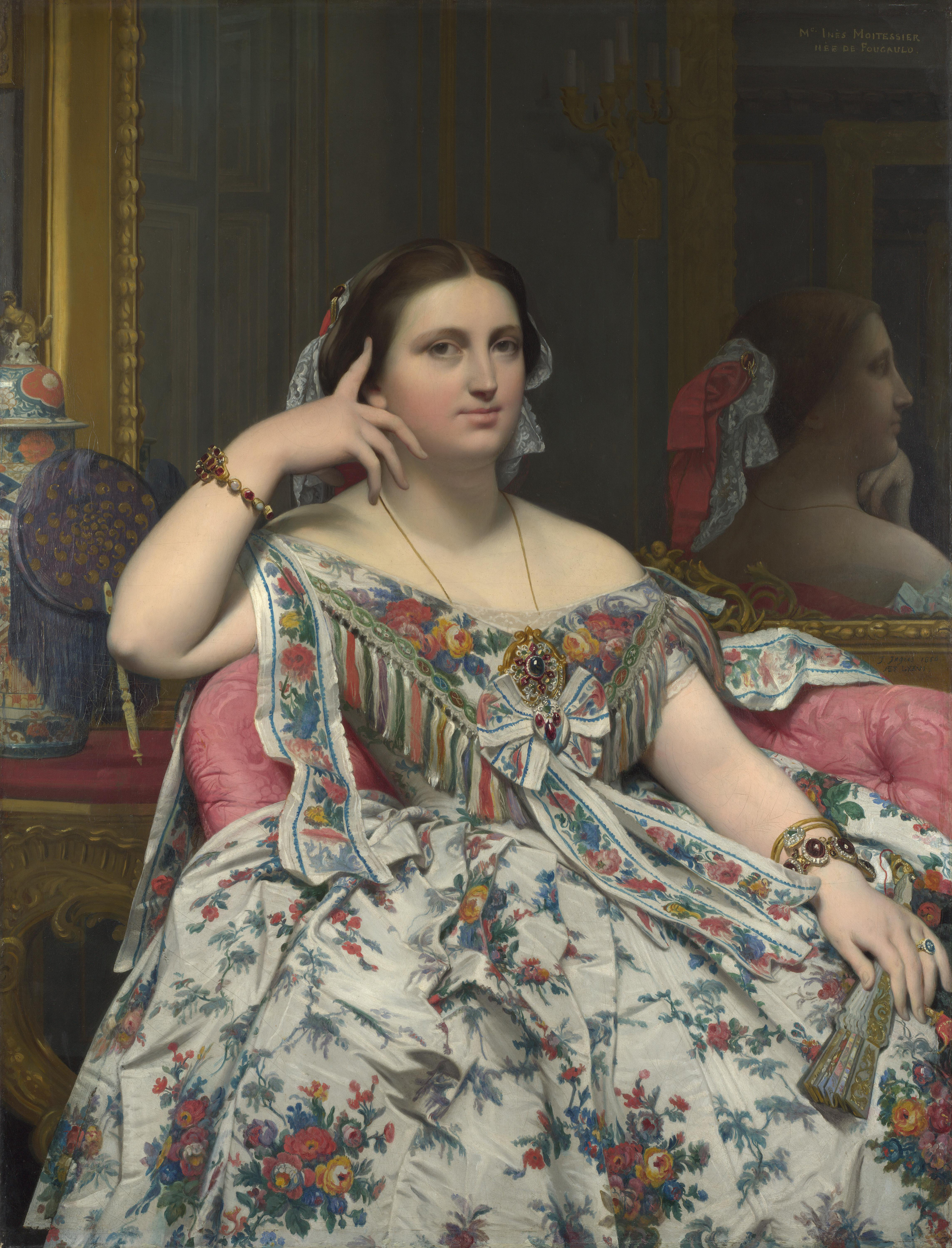
Mme. Moitessier, 1856, National Gallery

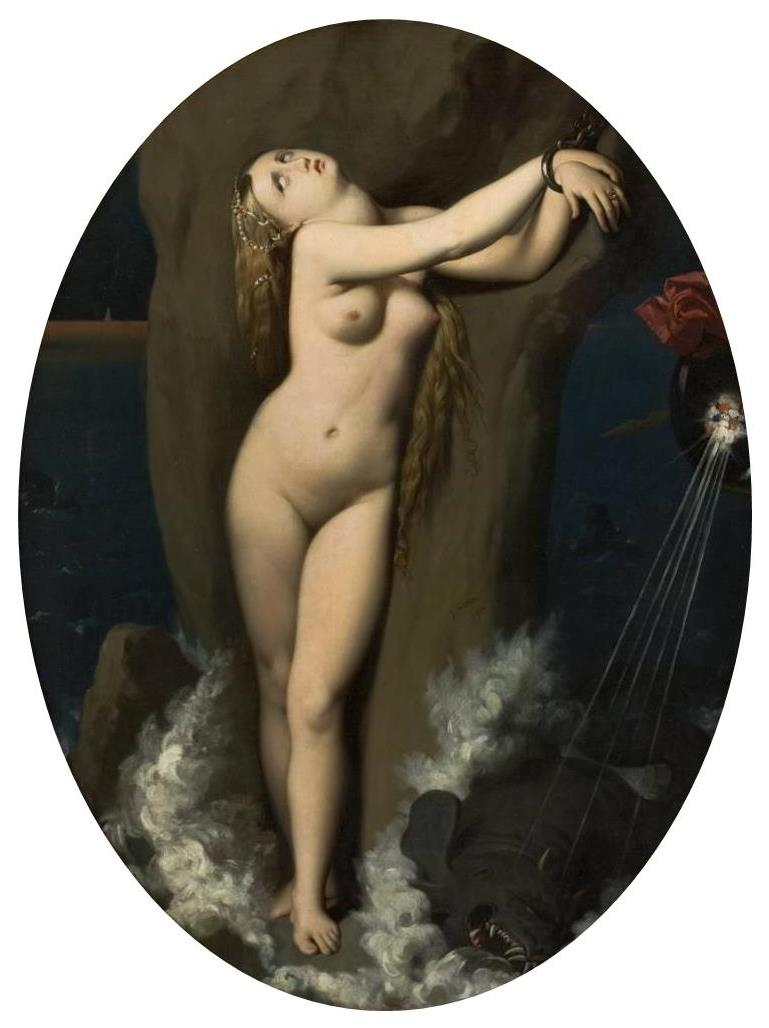
Angelica, 1859, São Paulo Museum of Art

== See also ==
- List of paintings by Jean-Auguste-Dominique Ingres
