= Self-Portrait (Ingres) =

Painting by Jean-Auguste-Dominique Ingres

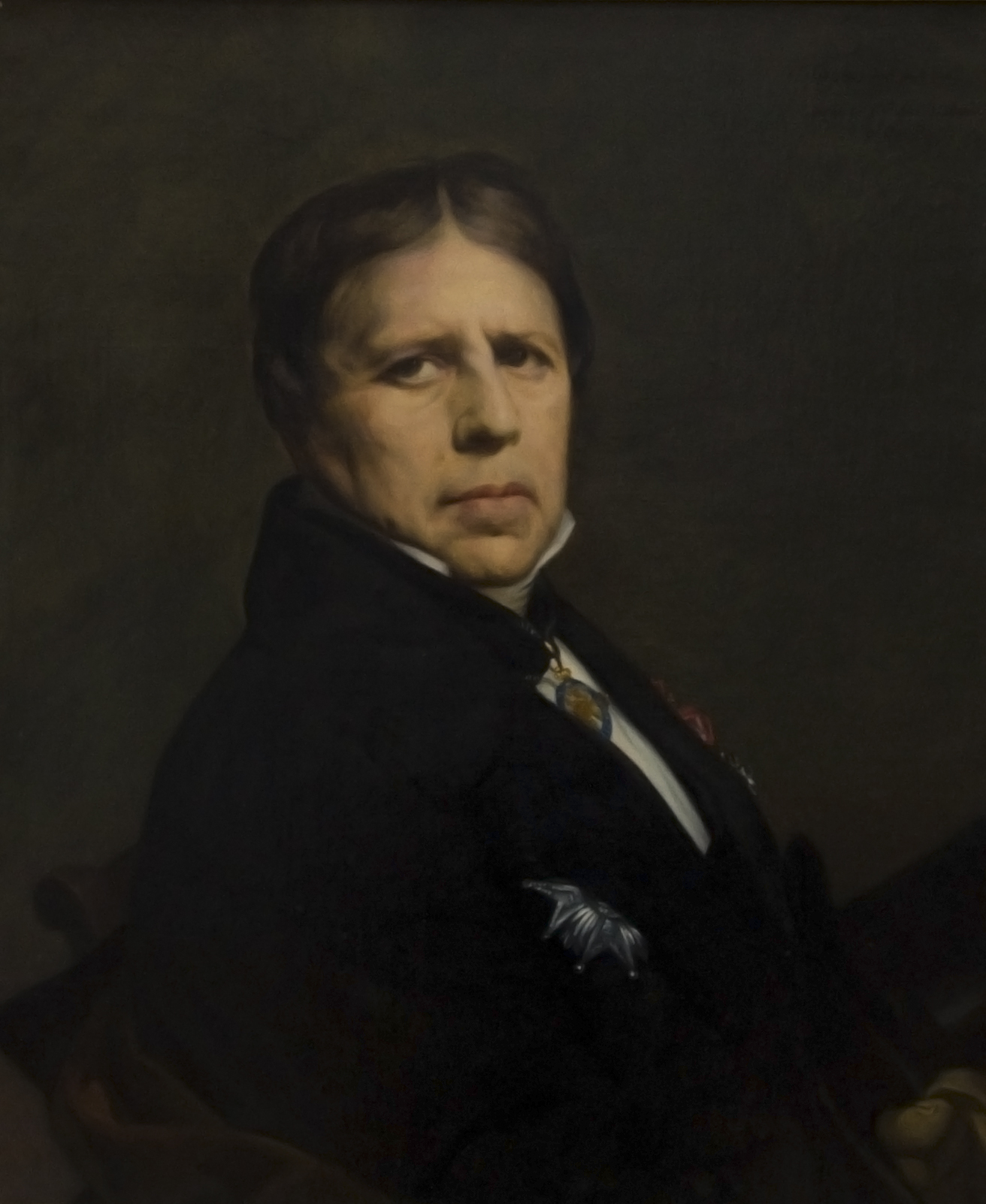
- Artist: Jean-Auguste-Dominique Ingres
- Year: 1864–1865
- Catalogue: 1526
- Medium: Oil on canvas
- Dimensions: 64 cm × 53 cm (25.2 in × 20.9 in)
- Location: Royal Museum of Fine Arts Antwerp; Antwerp

Self-Portrait is an oil-on-canvas painting by the French Neoclassical artist Jean-Auguste-Dominique Ingres. The painting measures 25.2 x 20.9 inches (64 x 53 cm) and is part of the permanent collection of the Royal Museum of Fine Arts in Antwerp. This painting is one of the last portraits by Ingres.

There is a similar portrait housed at the Uffizi in Florence, realized some six years earlier than the Antwerp painting. Both paintings reportedly are based on a 1855 photo. The paintings are different in many respects, such as the objects depicted therein (hat, state decorations), the sitter's posture, and the lighting. The Antwerp version also differs from the apparently near-identical Fogg Painting (a self-portrait by Ingres realized in 1859, currently housed at the Fogg Art Museum) both in execution and structure; in the Antwerp version the lighting differs, and Ingres' hat produces no shadow. In the Antwerp painting, produced five or six years after the Fogg painting, Ingres made himself look younger.

The 1864 self-portrait was realized for the Academy of Antwerp, upon Ingres' joining of the latter in old age. The portrait shows the painter's self-regard. Ingres was 84 at the time, but painted a handsomer, younger and slimmer version of himself. The painting is the complacent confirmation of the status Ingres had achieved. Ingres signed the portrait emphatically: J. Ingres peint par lui, pour la Célèbre Academie d’Anvers.

== Context ==
Ingres was a painter, draftsman, and violinist whose work art scholars have described as having a musical character because of its melodic flowing lines and soft, harmonic coloration. Art scientists consider Ingres, after Jacques-Louis David, to be the head of the French Classicist school. Ingres is noted for his genre scenes, mythological scenes and portraits.

Before his effective entry into the Antwerp Academy in 1857, Ingres was an additional member of the academic corps. He could only officially join after the death of Paul Delaroche, and was asked to provide a work of art and a self-portrait. His artwork would hang in the Museum van de Akademiekers, which was founded by the academy in 1852. The sick old artist found it difficult to comply. On July 3, 1865, he wrote a letter to the academy to apologize: Je regrette d'avoir tant tardé à envoyer mon portrait à l'Académie d'Anvers, comme je l'avais promis. J'espère que l ' Académie et vous, Monsieur le Président, voudrez bien m'excuser en égard à mon âge et à l'irrégularité de ma santé, qui ne m'ont pas permis de remplir plus tôt cet engagement.

The academy insisted and the elderly artist, then in poor health, eventually donated this self-portrait as a token of gratitude for his entry into the academy. He based this on two self-portraits from 1858 and 1859. All three works go back to a photo that was taken around 1855. Alphonse Masson made an etching after the photo in question. The magazine l'Artiste published the latter in its edition of April 5, 1857.

== Description ==
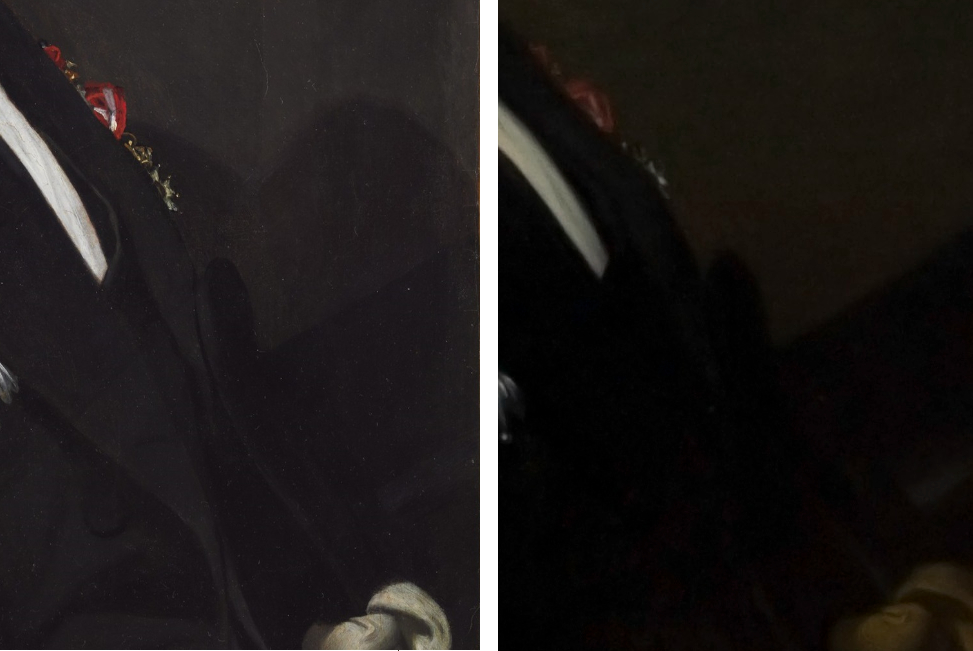
Detail of Ingres' hat in the Fogg (left) and Antwerp (right) paintings

In this self-portrait, Ingres's self-satisfied pose is not that of an artist, but that of a well-to-do bourgeois, a man of the world. Clearly, he was aware of his dignity. Complete with smart suit, top hat and gloves, he's ready to go out, but not without the medals and honours that he displays so proudly: the star of a Grand Officer in the French Legion of Honour, the cross of the Prussian Order of Merit, and a decoration awarded to him by the Grand Duke of Tuscany.

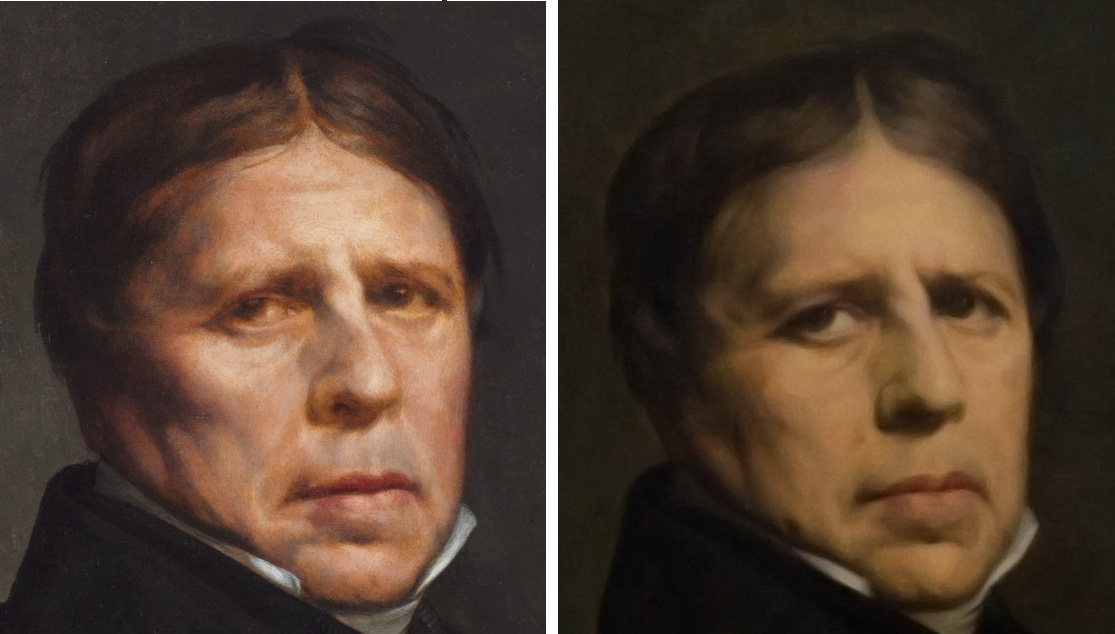
Detail of Ingres' look in the Fogg (left) and Antwerp (right) paintings

Striking is the skill wherewith the painter rendered fabrics. The black cloth of the jacket contrasts with the silk collar, just as the hard nose of his fleshy face stands out against his fine, sleek hair. What is striking about the portrait is the self-satisfied, penetrating and slightly mocking look. The confrontation between the painter and the audience is very direct. The painter clearly shows his self-pride in this portrait.

The portrait is a smug confirmation of Ingres' acquired status. Yet it is also an expression of his fear of death and decline. The portrait is Ingres' ultimate attempt to avert inevitable fate. He wrote: "I think a lot about my old age: it will take revenge on me".

== See also ==
- List of paintings by Jean-Auguste-Dominique Ingres

== Sources ==
- "Self Portrait". KMSKA.
- Jan Lea Broeckx in Musea van België. Koninklijk Museum voor Schone Kunsten te Antwerpen. Moderne meesters, 1958, nr. 2.
- Dorine Cardyn-Oomen, in Van Delacroix tot Courbet, 2004, p. 54–55; Peter De Laet, in Vouwblad Educatieve Dienst Koninklijk Museum voor Schone Kunsten Antwerpen. Het zelfportret: spiegel van mens en kunst, p. 6; Topstukken, 2007; Dankbrief van Nicaise de Keyser, 14 juli 1865; Museumkrant, maart-juni 2007, jrg 14/ n° 53, p. 10.
- Finberg, A. J. Ingres. London, ISBN 978-1-5327-0047-7
- Coll. Fogg Art Mus., Harvard Univ. Art Museum, Cambridge, Mass.; pendant van het Portret van Delphine Ramsey, zijn tweede vrouw.
- Museumkrant, maart-juni 2007, jrg 14/ n° 53, p. 10; Dorine Cardyn-Oomen, in Van Delacroix tot Courbet, 2004, p. 54–55.
- Dorine Cardyn-Oomen, in Van Delacroix tot Courbet, 2004, p. 54–55.
- Siska Beele Blog Ingres in beeld en woord, 10.02.2015.
- Museumkrant, maart-juni 2007, jrg 14/ n° 53, p. 10; Dorine Cardyn-Oomen, in Van Delacroix tot Courbet, 2004, p. 54–55; Jan Lea Broeckx in Musea van België. Koninklijk Museum voor Schone Kunsten te Antwerpen. Moderne meesters, 1958, nr. 2.
- Peter De Laet, in Vouwblad Educatieve Dienst Koninklijk Museum voor Schone Kunsten Antwerpen. Het zelfportret: spiegel van mens en kunst, p. 6.
