= Portrait of Amédée de Pastoret =

Painting by Jean-Auguste-Dominique Ingres

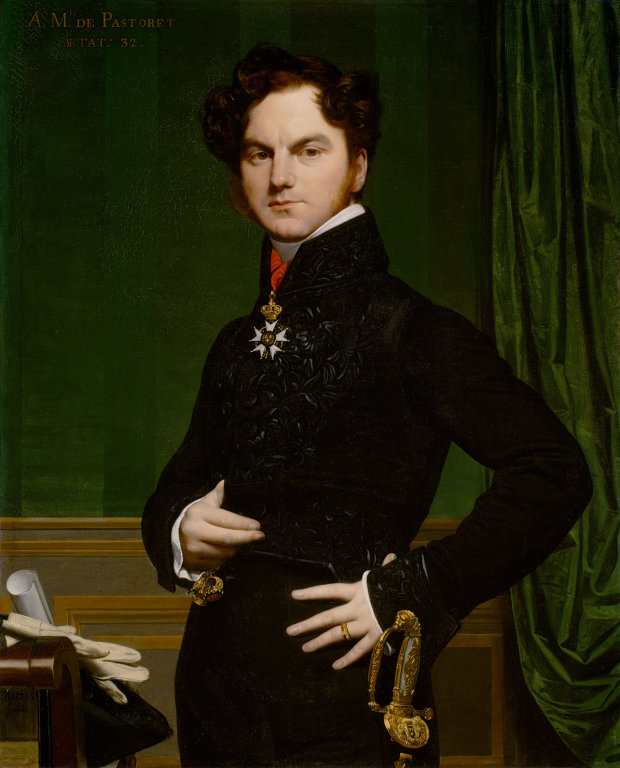
Portrait of Amédée-David de Pastoret (1826) by Ingres

Amédée-David, the Comte de Pastoret (1823-1826) is a portrait by French painter Jean-Auguste-Dominique Ingres. The oil on canvas painting depicts Count Amédée-David de Pastoret at 32 years old, wearing a medal of the Order of the Legion of Honor.

The portrait shows Amédée-David de Pastoret, a conseiller d'État and member of the Académie des Beaux-Arts. He was a close relation of the painter and commissioned several works, such as his The Dauphin's Entry Into Paris. It was painted the same year as Ingres' portrait of Madame Marcotte de Sainte-Marie - both works were badly received, precipitating a six-year period in which the artist produced no paintings. His next portrait would be his 1832 Portrait of Monsieur Bertin.

Still in his collection on his death, it was inherited by his widow and then their daughter the Marquise de Rougé du Plessis-Bellière. In 1884 it appeared in a catalogue of the marquise's collection at Château de Moreuil (Somme). After her death it was sold in 1897 as lot 85 in sale 4 on 10 and 11 May, where it was bought by the galerie Durand-Ruel. It was then acquired for 8745 francs by Edgar Degas and on his death it was sold off in 1918 in Paris. Selling for 90,000 francs, it was bought by the banker and collector David David-Weill, who then sold it to the Wildenstein Gallery, who in turn sold it to the Art Institute of Chicago in 1971, where it now hangs.

== See also ==
- List of paintings by Jean-Auguste-Dominique Ingres
