= Aretino and Charles V's Ambassador =

Painting by Jean-Auguste-Dominique Ingres

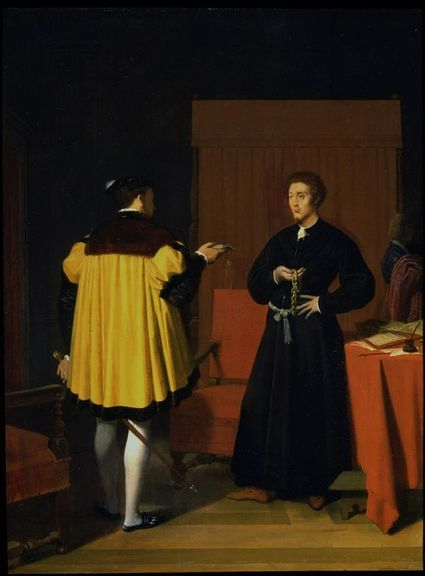
Aretino and Charles V's Ambassador, 1815

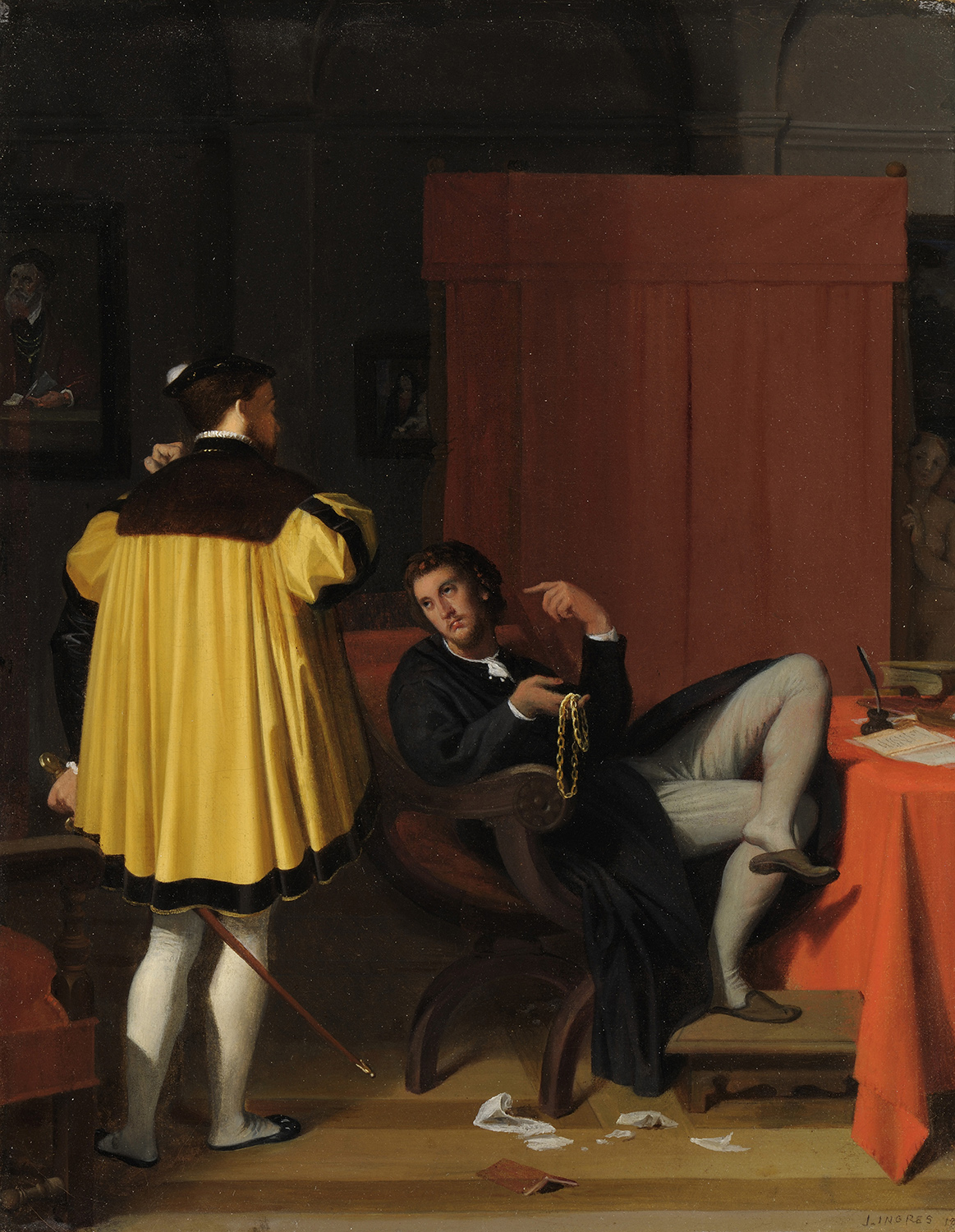
Aretino and Charles V's Ambassador, 1848

Aretino and Charles V's Ambassador is a painting by the French artist Jean-Auguste-Dominique Ingres, produced in an 1815 and an 1848 version. It is in the troubador style and shows Pietro Aretino facing Charles V's ambassador, who is trying to bribe him.

== 1815 version ==
The original version is an oil on panel and measures 44 cm x 33 cm (17 in. x 13 in.). It depicts Aretino standing as he confronts the emissary who stands at the left. Fearing the satirist's mockery after the debacle of Charles' Algiers expedition of 1541, the emperor has sent the ambassador to present Aretino with a gift of a gold chain, intended as a bribe. Holding the chain, Aretino declares: "Here is a trifling gift for so great a folly". A young man is in the background at the right. The painting is in a private collection, though a preparatory compositional sketch entered the Musée Ingres at Montauban in 1867.

== 1848 version ==
In 1848 Ingres painted a replica that differs in several details. In contrast to his resolute standing pose in the original version, Aretino is shown seated languidly in a chair. In the background at the right is a young woman; at the left hangs a self-portrait by Aretino's friend Titian. It is painted on canvas and the dimensions are 44 cm x 35.8 cm (17 in. x 14 in.).

This version was exhibited at the 1855 Exposition Universelle. Still owned by the family of Jean-Baptiste Marcotte-Genlis, it was also exhibited in Paris in 1913 and the 1990s.

The painting was acquired in December 2012 by the musée des beaux-arts de Lyon for 750,000 Euros, including an 80,000 E from a public appeal, to which 1536 people had donated.

== See also ==
- List of paintings by Jean-Auguste-Dominique Ingres
