= Portrait of the Duke of Orléans (Ingres) =

Painting by Jean-Auguste-Dominique Ingres

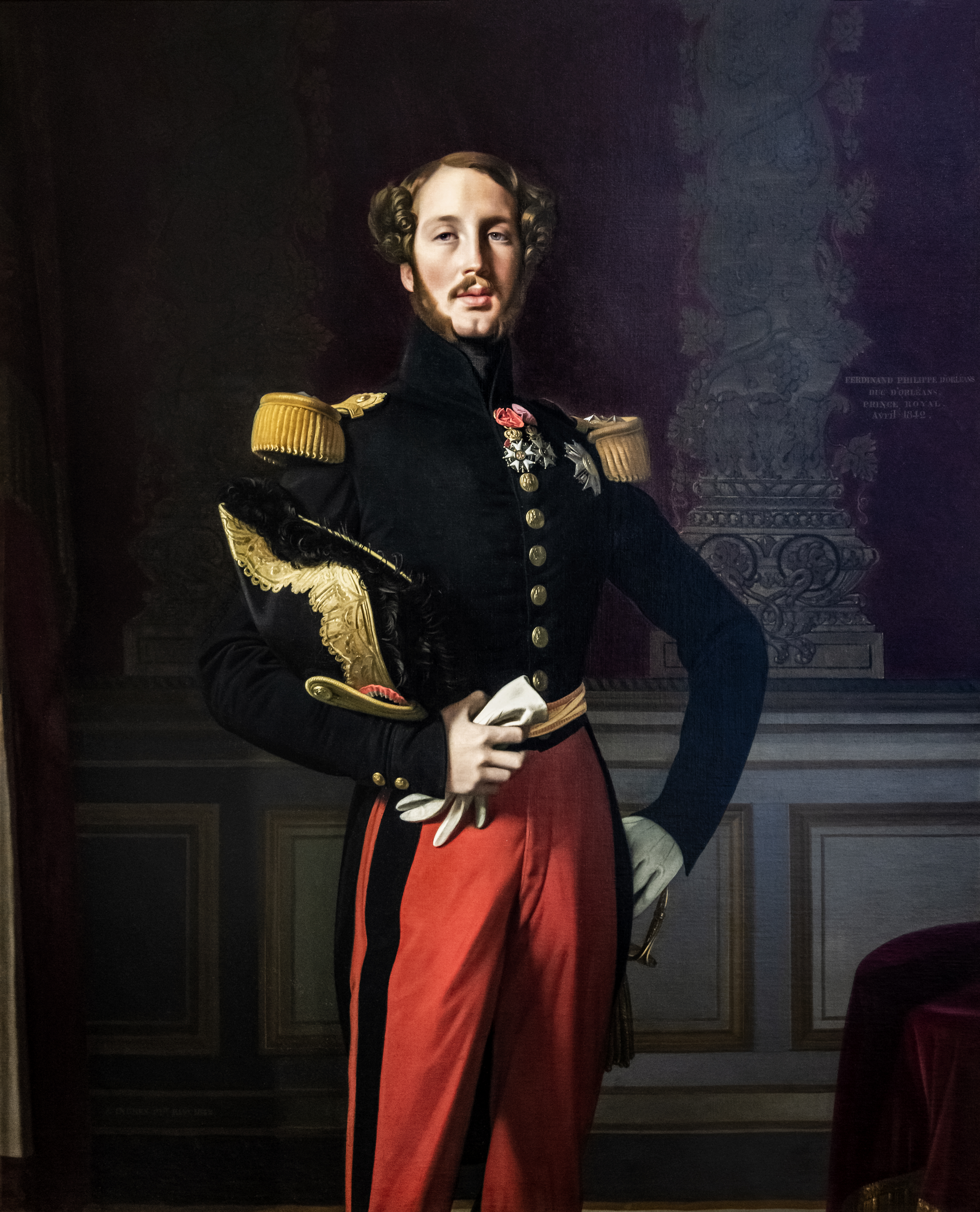
- Artist: Jean-Auguste-Dominique Ingres
- Year: 1842
- Type: Oil on canvas, portrait painting
- Dimensions: 158 cm × 122 cm (62 in × 48 in)
- Location: Louvre, Paris

Portrait of the Duke of Orléans is an 1842 portrait painting by the French artist Jean-Auguste-Dominique Ingres. It depicts Prince Ferdinand Philippe, Duke of Orléans the heir to the French throne of his father Louis Philippe I. His family had come to power following the July Revolution of 1830. Ingres was a noted portraitist of the July Monarchy era whose career stretched back to the rule of Napoleon. He is shown in the uniform of a Lieutenant General wearing the Legion of Honour and the Belgian Order of Leopold, granted to him by his brother-in-law Leopold I. A few months after he sat for the portrait Orléans was killed in a coach accident at the age of thirty one. He was succeeded as heir to the throne by his young son the Count of Paris. The original painting is now in the collection of the Louvre in Paris.

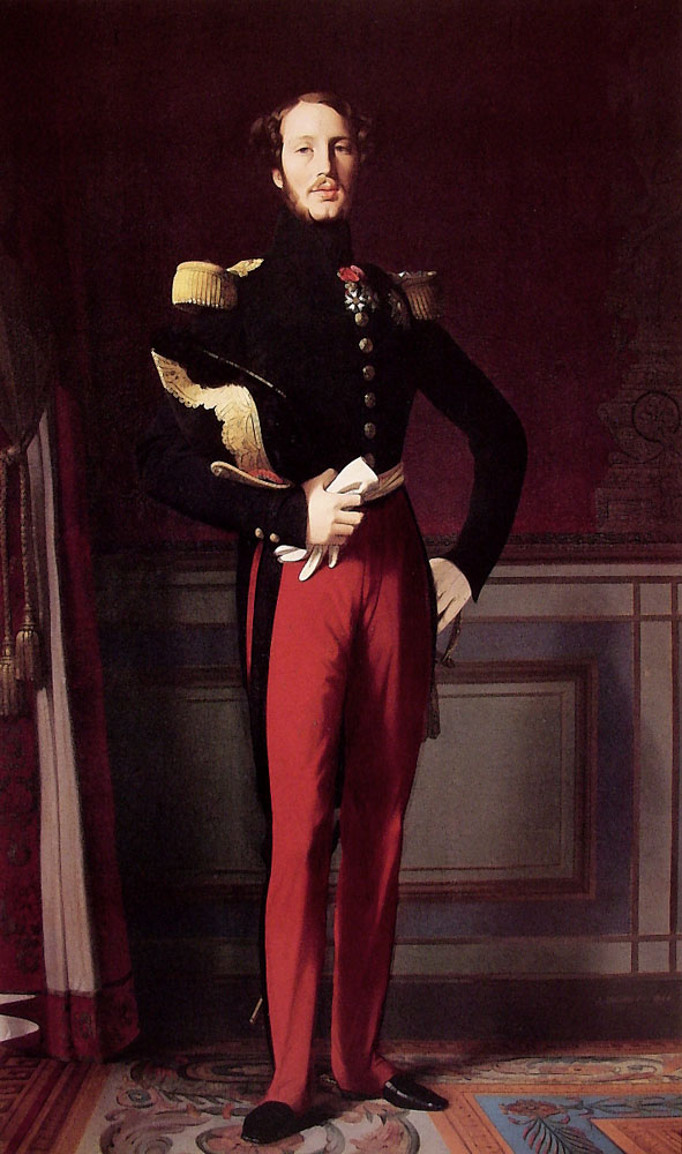
1844 full-length version produced for the Palace of Versailles

Various versions were produced, many by Ingres, including one commissioned in 1844 in the Palace of Versailles. Dutch artist Ary Scheffer had earlier painted the Duke in a hussar uniform, a picture which he exhibited at the Salon of 1831.

== See also ==
- List of paintings by Jean-Auguste-Dominique Ingres

== Bibliography ==
- Grimme, Karin H. Jean-Auguste-Dominique Ingres, 1780-1867. Taschen, 2006.
