= The Ambassadors of Agamemnon in the tent of Achilles =

Painting by Jean-Auguste-Dominique Ingres

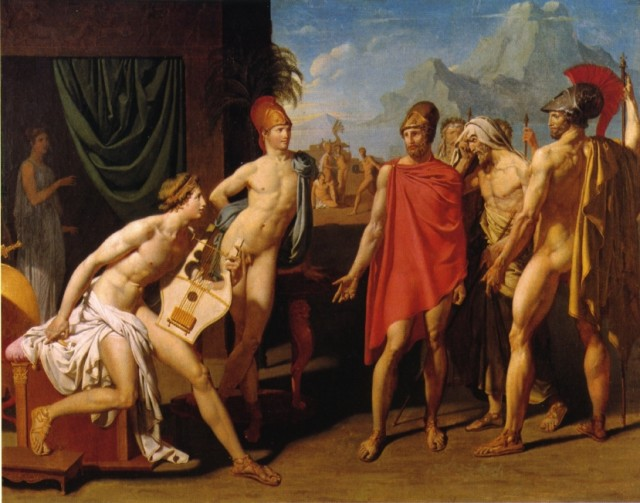
- Artist: Jean-Auguste-Dominique Ingres
- Year: 1801
- Dimensions: 110 cm (43 in) × 155 cm (61 in)
- Identifiers: Joconde work ID: 50510011403

The Ambassadors of Agamemnon in the tent of Achilles is an oil-on-canvas painting by Jean-Auguste-Dominique Ingres, produced in 1801 for the Prix de Rome competition. It is now in the École nationale supérieure des beaux-arts in Paris.

It shows an episode from Homer's Iliad, in which Achilles refuses to listen to the envoys sent by Agamemnon to convince him back into the Trojan War. The topic assigned for the artists competing for the Prix de Rome in 1801 was the warriors' procession toward battle; Ingres' interpretation of the subject characteristically emphasized a moment of psychological drama instead of physical action. The work was intended as a demonstration of Ingres' mastery of the human figure in classical history painting – Odysseus is shown in a red cloak derived from a sculpture by Pseudo-Phidias.

The painting is in the neo-classical style and belongs to the school of Jacques-Louis David, in whose studio Ingres had trained. It also shows new influences from John Flaxman, whose work had just had its first Parisian exhibition.

A small oil-on-wood sketch for the painting is in the collection of the nationalmuseum of Sweden.

== See also ==
- List of paintings by Jean-Auguste-Dominique Ingres

== Bibliography ==
- Condon, Patricia; Cohn, Marjorie B.; Mongan, Agnes. In Pursuit of Perfection: The Art of J.-A.-D. Ingres. Louisville: The J. B. Speed Art Museum, 1983. ISBN 0-9612276-0-5
- Ternois, Daniel. Ingres, Paris, Fernand Nathan, 1980 (ISBN 2-09-284-557-8)
