= Joan of Arc at the Coronation of Charles VII =

Painting by Jean-Auguste-Dominique Ingres

Joan Of Arc At The Coronation Of Charles VII
- Artist: Jean-Auguste-Dominique Ingres
- Completion date: 1854
- Medium: Oil on canvas
- Dimensions: 240 cm x 178 cm
- Location: Louvre, Paris
- Accession: MI 667
- Website: collections.louvre.fr/en/ark:/53355/cl010065747

Joan of Arc at the Coronation of Charles VII (French: Jeanne d’Arc au sacre du roi Charles VII) is an 1854 painting by the French Neoclassical artist Jean-Auguste-Dominique Ingres. It is now in the Louvre Museum in Paris.

The work merges the style of Ingres' teacher Jacques-Louis David with that of the troubador style. The scene is marked by ambient light, sumptuous objects and rich colours.

== History ==
In 1851, M. de Guisard, the state's Director of Fine Arts, gave Ingres a commission of 20,000 francs for a painting of a subject of Ingres's choosing. Ingres offered instead to fulfill the commission by finishing two paintings already in progress, Joan of Arc and a Virgin with a Host. Both were subjects he had depicted in earlier works: he had made a wash drawing of Joan of Arc as a model for an engraving by Pollet that was published in the 1840s in La Plutarque français, Vies des hommes et femmes illustres de la France by E. Mannechet. The drawing shows her in a pose similar to that of the later painting, dressed in armor and resting her hand on an altar, but with no accompanying figures.

For the painting Ingres made new preparatory drawings using a nude model. He then made drawings in which he added the clothes and armour. The final composition shows Joan at the coronation of Charles VII of France in Reims Cathedral, victorious and looking up to heaven, which she felt had given France the victory. To her right are three pages, the monk Jean Paquerel, and a servant. The servant is a self-portrait of the artist.

== Pastiche ==
In 1980, Michael Leonard drew a caricature for The Sunday Times depicting Margaret Thatcher as Joan based on the Ingres work.

== See also ==
- List of paintings by Jean-Auguste-Dominique Ingres
