= Amédée-David de Pastoret =

French writer and politician (1791–1857)

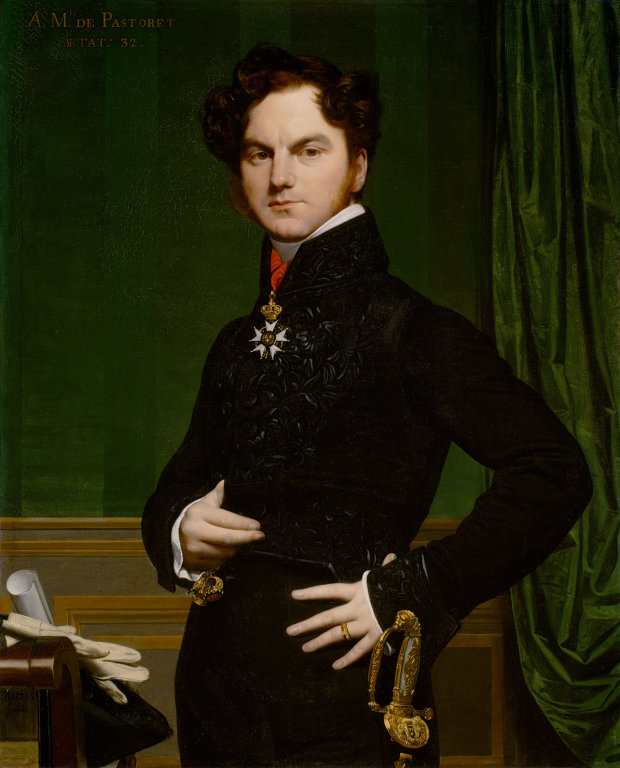
Portrait of Amédée de Pastoret by Ingres.

Amédée, marquis de Pastoret (2 January 1791 – 18 May 1857) was a French writer and politician.

Born in Paris, he was the son of marquis Emmanuel de Pastoret, parliamentarian and minister. He was sent to Rome in 1809 secretary general to the minister of the interior of the provisional government. He became a legitimist and refused to swear loyalty to Louis-Philippe of France in 1830. He rallied to Louis-Napoléon and was made a senator of the Second French Empire on 31 December 1852. He was a patron of Ingres, commissioning several of his works such as The Dauphin's Entry Into Paris. He died in Paris.

== Works ==
- Les Troubadours, poem (1813)
- Des moyens mis en usage par Henri IV pour s'assurer la couronne (1815 and 1819)
- Les Normands en Italie ou Salerne délivrée, poem (1818)
- Sur Monseigneur le duc de Berry (1820)
- Le duc de Guise à Naples, novel (1825)
- Récits historiques (1826)
- Le Duc de Guise à Naples, ou Mémoires sur les révolutions de ce royaume en 1647 et 1648, Paris, Urbain Canel, in 8°, 318 p. (1828);
- Histoire de la chute de l'empire grec, 1400-1480, Paris, A. Levavasseur, Urbain Canel, in 8°, 357 p. (1829)
- Claire Catalanzi ou La Corse en 1736 (1838)
- Instructions à l'usage des voyageurs en Orient. Histoire. Les Croisades. Paris, Imprimerie impériale, 1 vol. in 8°, II+138 pp. (1856).
