= La Belle Zélie =

Painting by Jean-Auguste-Dominique Ingres

La belle Zélie, Ingres, 49cm × 59cm, 1806. Musée des Beaux-Arts de Rouen

Portrait of Madame Aymon, La Belle Zélie is an 1806 oil on canvas painting by the French artist Jean-Auguste-Dominique Ingres. The painting is one of Ingres' early painted portraits, completed just before his first stay in Rome. It first came to public notice during an 1867 Ingres exhibition in Paris and was acquired by the Musée des Beaux-Arts de Rouen in 1870.

Although the work is signed and dated on the lower left of the canvas, the identity of the sitter is uncertain. The painting was untitled when it entered the collection of the Musée des Beaux-Arts de Rouen, shortly beforehand she was tentatively identified as a Madame Aymon (disputed by the Beaux-Arts de Rouen), with the portrait given the nickname of La belle Zélie, a reference to a popular song in the 1870s, mentioned because of the "subtle hint of vulgarity" apparent in the painting. If the sitter is a Madame Aymon, Ingres may also have portrayed her husband, though no such work is known.

The sitter is shown in three-quarters view, placed against a backdrop of open sky with some clouds. The central canvas is dominated by red, black and brown colours. As with many of Ingres' female portraits, the sitter is given Greek or Raphaelesque features. "Sensuous and sleepy", she bears facial resemblance to figures in Ingres' later "Odalisque" paintings of harem women. She has an expressive, oval face and almond eyes. Her eyes are slightly parted, her cheeks flushed. The woman's black hair falls over her forehead in three thick curls. She wears long diamond earrings on her unusually elongated ear, and a pearl necklace on her unnaturally long, "swan like" neck. Her silk bodice is brown and low-cut with a wide neckline, worn over a crimson shawl. The painting is full of accentuating curves; from the oval cut of the canvas to the round hair curls, the shape of her face and the shape of her necklace.

== See also ==
- List of paintings by Jean-Auguste-Dominique Ingres

== Sources ==
- Conisbee, Philip. Portraits by Ingres: Image of an Epoch. New York: Metropolitan Museum of Art, 1999. ISBN 978-0-300-08653-9
- Friedlaender, Walter F. David to Delacroix. MA: Harvard University Press, 1974. ISBN 978-0-6741-9401-4
- Rosenblum, Robert. Ingres. New York: New York University, 1956
- Wildenstein, Georges. "The Paintings of J. A. D. Ingres". London:n Phaidon Press, 1954
