= Portrait of Caroline Murat, Queen of Naples =

Painting by Jean-Auguste-Dominique Ingres

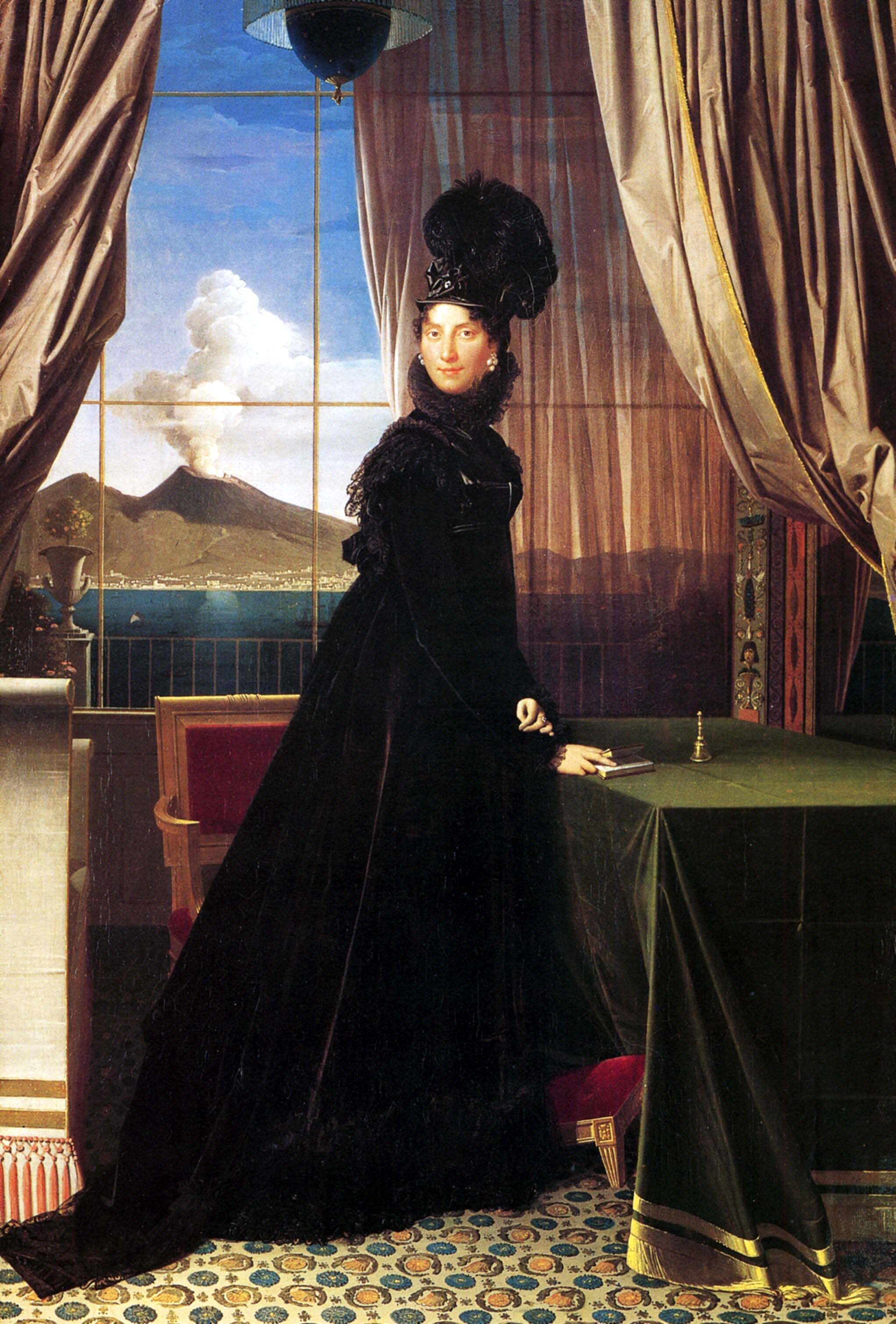
Ingres, Portrait of Caroline Murat, 92 × 60cm, 1814. Private collection, New York

Portrait of Caroline Murat, Queen of Naples is an 1814 oil on canvas painting by the French Neoclassical artist Jean-Auguste-Dominique Ingres. Caroline Murat, née Bonaparte, was the sister of Napoleon, and married Joachim Murat, a Marshal of France and Admiral of France, and later King of Naples. Caroline commissioned the portrait as part of an effort to convey her standing and worth to reign as Queen of Naples during an unstable political climate.

Long considered lost or destroyed since the fall of Murat in 1815, the painting was rediscovered in 1987 by the art historian Hans Naef. It is now in a private collection in New York.

== Commission ==
Caroline was an art lover, and in 1814 commissioned a number of paintings from Ingres, her favored artist. These include his Grande Odalisque, its now lost sister piece La Dormeuse de Naples, and Paolo and Francesca. The painting was completed shortly before the 1815 collapse of the Naples regime after Napoleon's empire crumbled following his defeat of the Battle of Waterloo. Joachim was executed by firing squad in October of that year (his wife lived until 1839). Consequently, Ingres's was not paid for his earlier commissions. The painting was begun in Naples, and completed after he had moved to Rome in May 1815.

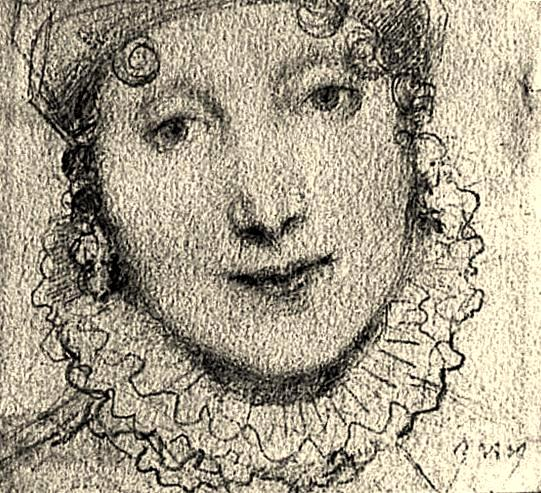
Preparatory study, 1814. Graphite on paper, Musée Ingres, Montauban

Ingres' created several preparatory studies, including close-ups of her face, and full sketch of the family. Due to the artist's exacting and precise approach and technique, the undertaking was long and slowly moving. Both Caroline and Ingres considered painting to be unfinished.

== Description ==
Her regal pose is reminiscent of Napoleon in Ingres' Bonaparte, First Consul of 1804. Ingres shows her in full length, dress in a long, high waisted black velvet dress and pelisse. Her expression is pious, while her black hat is trimmed with ostrich feathers. She stands in the royal apartment in Naples, before a large bay window which looks out to Mount Vesuvius. The painting is filled with luxurious, prestige items appealing to both Italian and French taste. Moorish influence can be seen in the heavy velvet and lace.

== See also ==
- List of paintings by Jean-Auguste-Dominique Ingres

== Sources ==
- Dahlin, Brittany. "Caroline Murat: Powerful Patron of Napoleonic France and Italy". Brigham Young University, 2014.
- Conisbee, Philip. Portraits by Ingres: Image of an Epoch. New York: Metropolitan Museum of Art, 1999. ISBN 978-0-300-08653-9
