= Oedipus and the Sphinx (Ingres) =

Painting by Jean-Auguste-Dominique Ingres

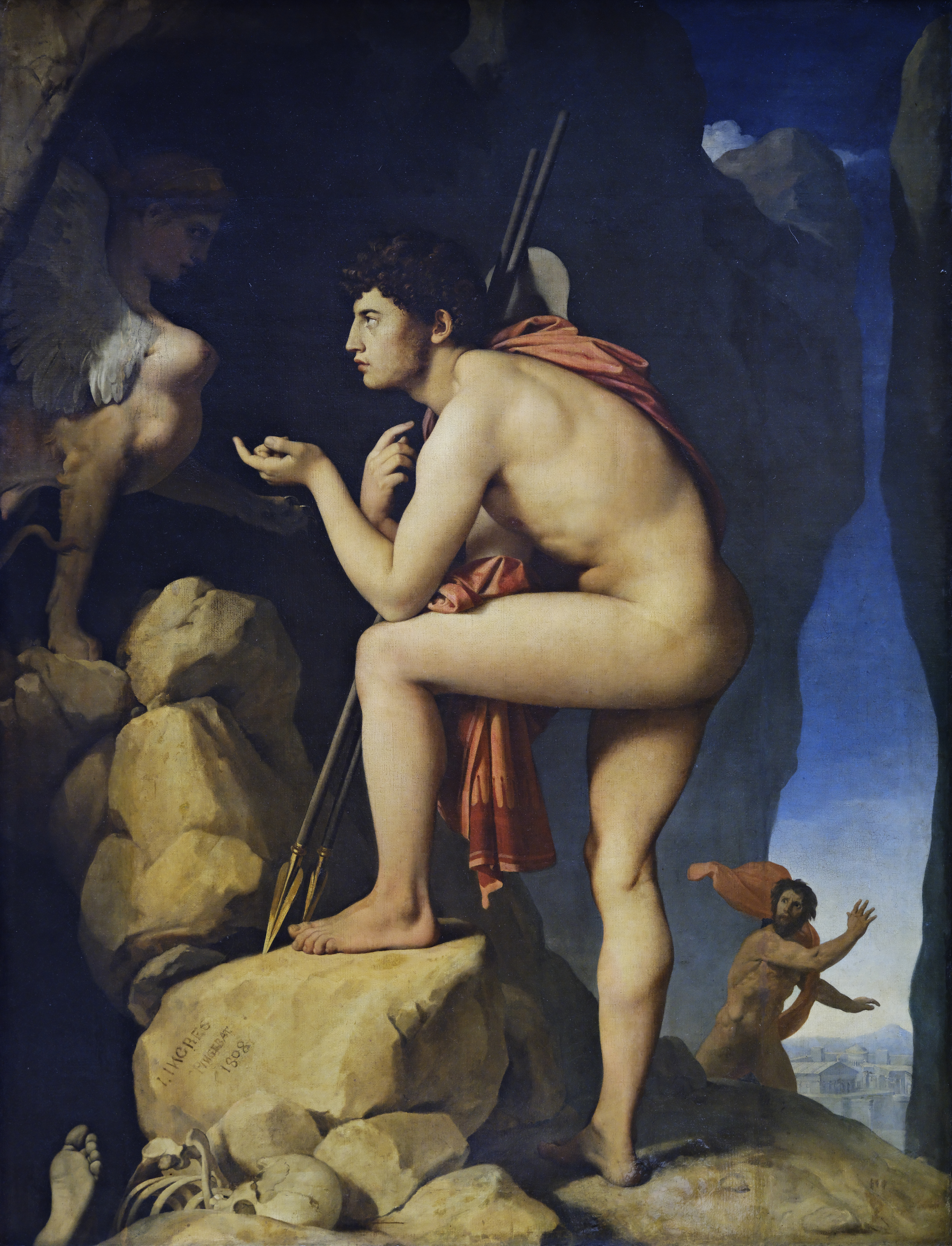
- Artist: Jean-Auguste-Dominique Ingres
- Year: 1808
- Medium: oil on canvas
- Movement: Neoclassicism
- Dimensions: 189 cm × 144 cm (74 in × 57 in)
- Location: Louvre; Paris

Oedipus and the Sphinx is a painting by the French Neoclassical artist Jean-Auguste-Dominique Ingres. Originally a student work painted in 1808, it was enlarged and completed in 1827. The painting depicts Oedipus explaining the riddle of the Sphinx. An oil painting on canvas, it measures 189 x 144 cm, and is in the Louvre, which acquired it in 1878.

== History ==
The painting was begun in Rome, where Ingres had arrived belatedly in 1806 after winning the Grand Prix de Rome in 1801. Working in a studio on the grounds of the Villa Medici, Ingres continued his studies and, as required of every winner of the Prix, he sent works at regular intervals to Paris so his progress could be judged. As his envoi of 1808 Ingres sent a life-size Figure of Oedipus and The Valpinçon Bather, hoping by these two paintings to demonstrate his mastery of the male and female nude. The academicians were moderately critical of the treatment of light in both paintings, and considered the figures to be insufficiently idealized.

Afterwards, Ingres retained the Figure of Oedipus in his studio for years. Around 1825 he decided to rework it to turn what was essentially a figure study into a more developed narrative scene. He enlarged the canvas, adding 20 cm to the left edge, 31 cm to the top, and 31 cm to the right. Within the expanded picture space he created a dramatic contrast between the brightly illuminated landscape seen in the distance, and the shadows that envelop the Sphinx. Ingres modified the pose of the Sphinx and added the human remains seen in the lower left corner. The fleeing man seen at the right, whose attitude and expression reveal Ingres's study of Poussin, was also added at this time. In November 1827 Ingres exhibited the finished work, along with two portraits, in the Salon, where they were well received.

The painting is signed and dated 1808 at the lower left. Ingres sold Oedipus and the Sphinx in 1829, and it entered the Louvre in 1878.

A small oil sketch of ca. 1826 in which Ingres tested his composition before reworking the painting is in the National Gallery, London. It was once owned by Edgar Degas, who purchased it in 1897 or earlier.

In 1864 Ingres painted a third version of Oedipus and the Sphinx, smaller than the first version, which reverses the composition and varies many details. It is in the Walters Art Museum, Baltimore, Maryland.

== Gallery ==
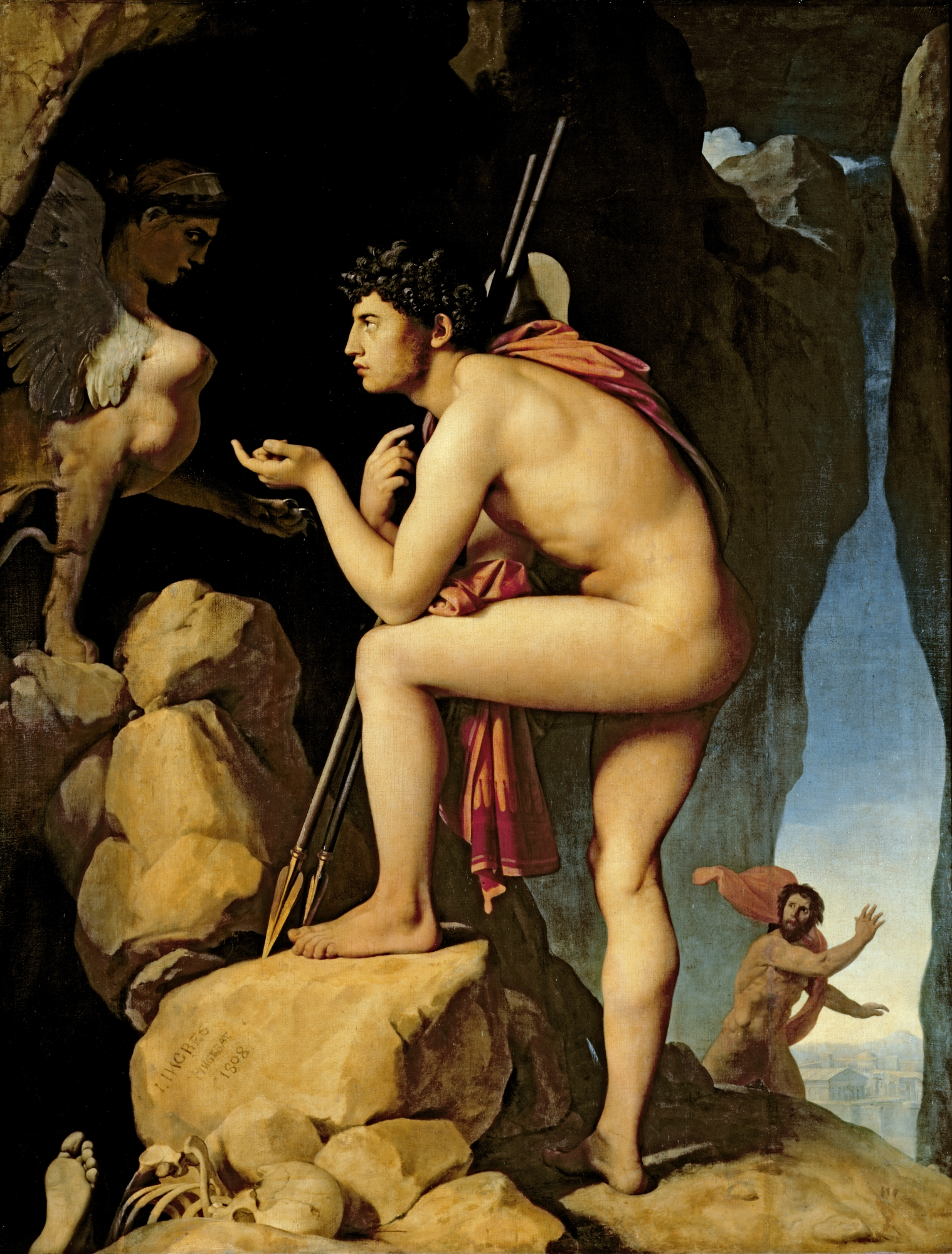
1808-27, 144 x 189 cm, Louvre Museum, Paris

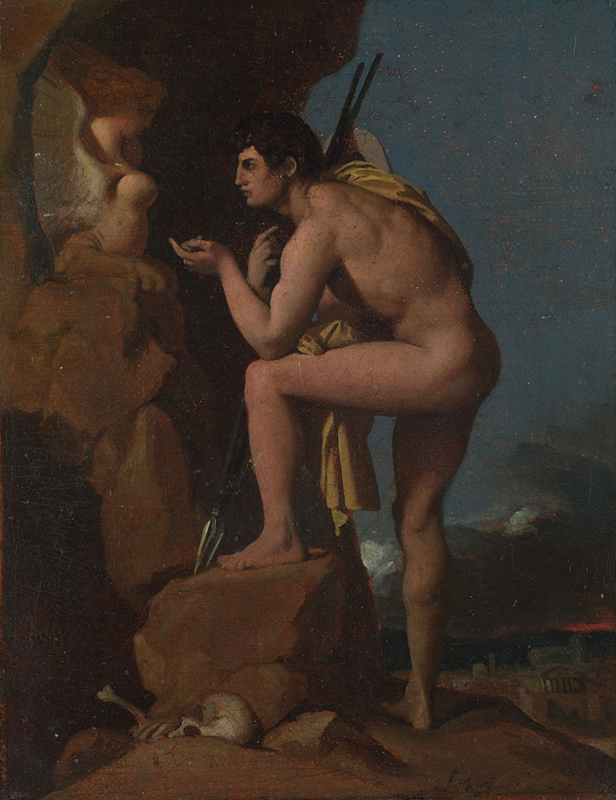
1826, 17.5 x 13.7 cm, National Gallery, London

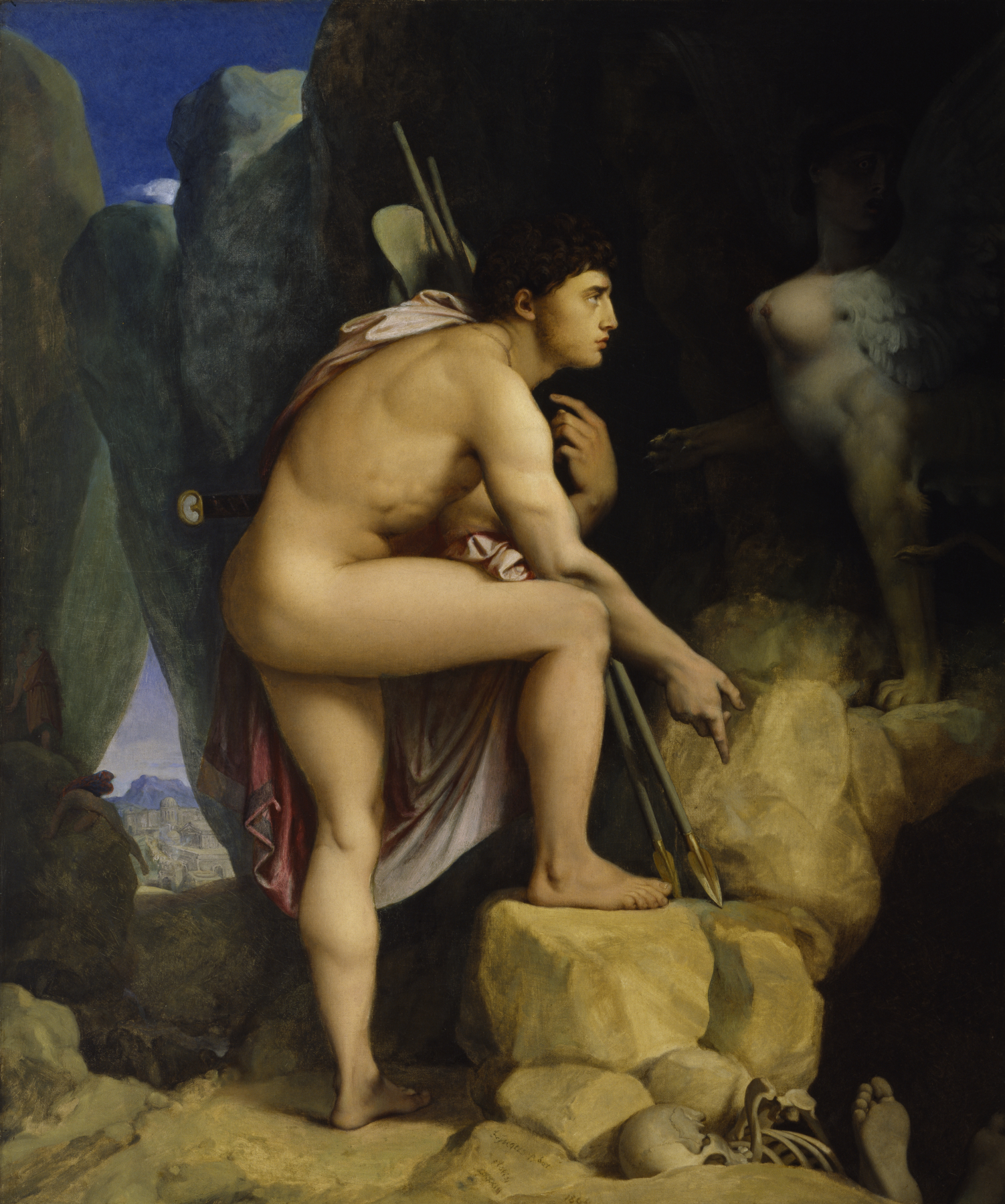
1864, 105.5 x 87 cm, Walters Art Museum, Baltimore

== See also ==
- List of paintings by Jean-Auguste-Dominique Ingres
