= List of paintings by Jean-Auguste-Dominique Ingres =

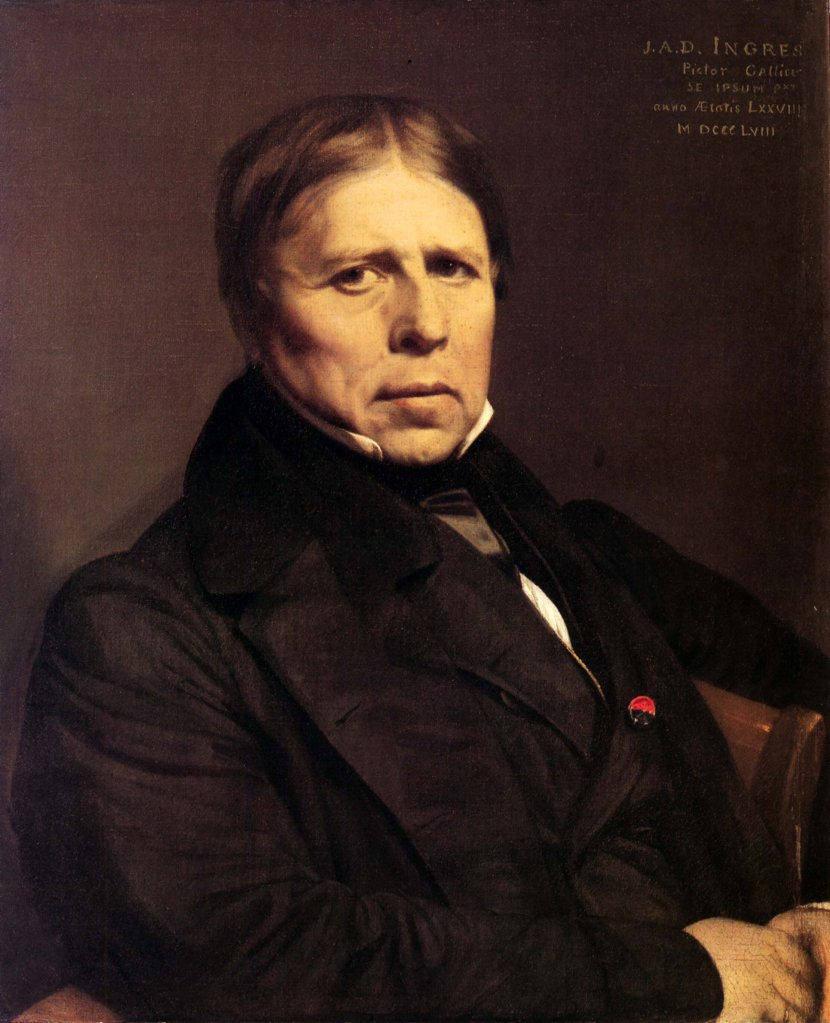
Self-Portrait at Seventy-Eight, 1858, 62 x 51 cm.

This is an incomplete list of paintings by the French neoclassical painter Jean-Auguste-Dominique Ingres (1780–1867). Although he considered himself a classicist in the tradition of Nicolas Poussin and Jacques-Louis David and had a longstanding rivalry with Eugène Delacroix, some of his later works included elements of romanticism and orientalism. Despite his desire to be seen as a great history painter, traditionally viewed as the most important genre of painting, it is his portraits, both painted and drawn, rather than his history paintings that are recognized as his greatest legacy. His expressive distortions of form and space made him an important precursor of modern art, influencing Picasso, Matisse and other modernists.

In 1802 he made his Salon debut, and won the Prix de Rome for his painting The Ambassadors of Agamemnon in the tent of Achilles. By the time he departed in 1806 for his residency in Rome, his style—revealing his close study of Italian and Flemish Renaissance masters, particular Raphael—was fully developed, and would change little for the rest of his life. He was finally recognized at the Salon in 1824, when his Raphaelesque painting, The Vow of Louis XIII, was met with acclaim, and Ingres was acknowledged as the leader of the Neoclassical school in France.

== List ==
=== Paris (1800–1806) ===
Image	Title	Date	Current location	Dimensions (in cm's)
	Antiochus	1800	Destroyed by fire in 1871	109.9 x 154.9
	Pierre-Francois Bernier	1800	Private collection	46.3 x 38.1
	Study of a Male Nude	1800	École nationale supérieure des Beaux-Arts, Paris	100 x 80
	Male Torso	1800	Musée Ingres, Montauban	99 x 80
	The Ambassadors of Agamemnon in the tent of Achilles	1801	École nationale supérieure des Beaux-Arts, Paris	110 x 155
	The Envoys of Agamemnon	1801	Nationalmuseum, Stockholm	25 x 32.5
	Academic Study of a Male Torso	1801	National Museum, Warsaw	97.5 x 80.6
	Male Nude	1801	Musée Ingres, Montauban	78.1 x 54.9
	Male Nude	1801	Musée Ingres, Montauban	78.1 x 54.9
	The Comtesse de la Rue	1804	Foundation E.G. Bührle, Zürich	28.9 x 22.9
	Bonaparte, First Consul	1804	Curtius Museum, Liège	226 x 144
	Portrait of Jean-Pierre-François Gilibert	1804	Musée Ingres, Montauban	100 x 91
	Portrait of Jean-Marie-Joseph Ingres, the Painters Father	1804	Musée Ingres, Montauban	55 x 47
	Self-Portrait Aged 24	1804	Musée Condé, Chantilly	77 x 61
	Self-Portrait Aged 24 (Note: This version was made between 1850 and 1860 by one of Ingres pupils (possibly Madame Gustave Héquet) under Ingres' supervision and retouched by him after he acquired it in 1866)	1850–60	Metropolitan Museum of Art, New York	86.4 x 69.9
	Portrait of Yong Man with an Earring	1804	Musée Ingres, Montauban	40.9 x 33
	Portrait of Belvèze-Foulon	1805	Musée Ingres, Montauban	55 x 46
	The Engraver Desmarets	1805	Musée des Augustins, Toulouse	65 x 54.5
	Portrait of Philibert Rivière	1805	Louvre, Paris	116 x 88.9
	Portrait of Marie-Françoise Rivière	1805	Louvre, Paris	117 x 82
	Mademoiselle Caroline Rivière	1806	Louvre, Paris	100 x 70
	La Belle Zélie (Portrait of Madame Aymon)	1806	Musée des Beaux-Arts de Rouen	59 x 49
	Portrait of Lorenzo Bartolini	1806	Musée Ingres, Montauban	98 x 80
	Napoleon I on His Imperial Throne	1806	Musée de l'Armée, Paris	259 x 162
	Venus, Wounded by Diomedes, Returns to Olympus		Kunstmuseum Basel	26.6 x 32.6
	Copy of a Detail from Poussin's Eliezer and Rebecca		Musée des beaux-arts de Marseille	46 x 37
	Portrait of Couderc-Gentillon		Private collection	54.9 x 46
	Portrait of Talma		Private collection	45 x 34.9
	Portrait of Baron Joseph-Pierre Vialetès de Mortarieu	1806	Norton Simon Museum, Pasadena	61.2 x 50.2

=== Italy (1806–1824) ===
Image	Title	Date	Current location	Dimensions (in cm's)
	The Half-Length Bather	1807	Musée Bonnat, Bayonne	51 x 42.5
	The Orangerie at the Villa Borghese	1807	Musée Ingres, Montauban	17 x 17.5
	Le Aurora Casino of the villa Ludovisi	1807	Musée Ingres, Montauban	17 x 17.5
	Portrait of Madame Duvaucey	1807	Musée Condé, Chantilly	76 x 59
	Portrait of Madame Duvaucey	1807	Musée Bonnat, Bayonne	29 x 23.5
	Raphael's Casino in Rome	1807	Musée des Arts Décoratifs, Paris	14.9 diameter
	Portrait of François Marius Granet	1807	Musée Granet, Aix-en-Provence	75 x 53
	Old Man Seated	1807	Musée Granet, Aix-en-Provence	69.8 x 53
	The Valpinçon Bather	1808	Louvre, Paris	146 x 97.5
	A Sleeping Odalisque		Victoria and Albert Museum	29.8 x 47.6
	The Sleeping Woman of Naples		Unknown (Note: Disappeared during the pillaging that followed Joachim Murat's fall from power in 1815)	
	Oedipus and the Sphinx	1808–27	Louvre, Paris	189 x 144
	Oedipus and the Sphinx	1826	National Gallery, London	17.5 x 13.7
	Head of a Bearded Man	1808	Musée Granet, Aix-en-Provence	33 x 24.1
	Fair Haired Girl with Blue Eyes		Private collection	26.3 x 20
	Copy of Raphael's "Eve Tempting Adam with the Forbidden Fruit"	1809	Musée Ingres, Montauban	92 x 56
	Copy of the Heads of a Woman and Children in Raphael's "Mass of Bolsena"	1809	Musée Ingres, Montauban	53 x 40
	Portrait of Charles Marcotte	1810	National Gallery of Art, Washington, D.C.	93.7 x 69.4
	Portrait of Jean-Baptiste Desdéban	1810	Musée des Beaux-Arts et d'Archéologie de Besançon	60 x 47
	Portrait of Joseph-Antoine Moltedo	1810	Metropolitan Museum of Art, New York	75.2 x 58.1
	Jupiter and Thetis	1811	Musée Granet, Aix-en-Provence	324 x 260
	Head of Jupiter		Unknown	47 x 39
	Head of Jupiter in Profile		Private collection	47.9 x 40
	Portrait of Edmé Bochet	1811	Louvre, Paris	94 x 69
	Portrait of Madame Panckoucke	1811	Louvre, Paris	93 x 68
	Portrait of Charles-Joseph-Laurent Cordier	1811	Louvre, Paris	90 x 69.5
	Portrait of Hippolyte-François Devillers	1811	Private collection	99 x 80
	Portrait of Dr. De France		Private collection	61.9 x 50.2
	Portrait of Paul Lemoyne	1811	Nelson-Atkins Museum of Art, Kansas City	47.1 x 36.5
	Portrait of Monsieur de Norvins	1811	National Gallery, London	97 x 78
	Romulus' Victory Over Acron	1812	École des Beaux-Arts, Paris	276 x 530
	Virgil reading The Aeneid before Augustus, Livia and Octavia	1812	Musée des Augustins, Toulouse	307 x 326
	Portrait of the Countess of Tournon	1812	Philadelphia Museum of Art	92.5 x 73.2
	The Betrothal of Raphael and the Niece of Cardinal Bibbiena	1813	Walters Art Museum, Baltimore	59.1 x 46.5
	The Dream of Ossian	1813	Musée Ingres, Montauban	348 x 275
	Raphael and La Fornarina	1813	Fogg Museum, Cambridge	64.8 x 53.3
	Raphael and the Fornaria		Private collection	31.1 x 26.7
	Pope Pius VII in the Sistine Chapel	1814	National Gallery of Art, Washington, D.C.	74.5 x 92.7
	Grande Odalisque	1814	Louvre, Paris	91 x 162
	Paolo and Francesca da Rimini	1814	Musée Condé, Chantilly	35 x 28
	Portrait of Caroline Murat, Queen of Naples	1814	Private collection	92 x 60
	The Duke of Alba at Sainte-Gudule in Brussels	1815	Musée Ingres, Montauban	105 x 82
	Aretino and Charles V's Ambassador	1815	Private collection	44.5 x 33
	Aretino in the Studio of Tintoretto	1815	Private collection	44.5 x 33
	Portrait of Jean-Pierre Cortot	1815	National Museum of Fine Arts of Algiers	41.9 x 33
	Portrait of Joseph-Antoine de Nogent	1815	Fogg Museum, Cambridge	47 x 33
	Madame Ingres, the Painter's Wife		Private collection	67.9 x 54.6
	Portrait of Abbot de Bonald	1816	Louvre, Paris	12.5 x 9.5
	Portrait of Madame de Senonnes	1816	Musée d'Arts de Nantes	106 x 84
	Head of a Bearded Man		Private collection	36.8 x 28
	Henry IV Receiving the Spanish Ambassador	1817	Petit Palais, Paris	70.5 x 80.5
	Henry IV, the Dauphin and the Spanish Ambassador	1817	Victoria and Albert Museum, London	50.5 x 62.3
	Henry IV Playing with his Children	1817	Private collection	41.9 x 47
	Copy of Raphael's "Virgin with the Candlesticks"	1817	Château de Blois	35.9 x 26.7
	The Death of Leonardo da Vinci	1818	Petit Palais, Paris	72 x 81.5
	The Death of Leonard da Vinci		Smith College Museum of Art, Northampton	40.9 x 47.9
	Philip V of Spain Investing Marshal Berwick with the Golden Fleece	1818	Private collection	87.7 x 108.9
	Paolo and Francesca da Rimini	1819	Musée des Beaux-Arts d'Angers	47.9 x 39
	Paolo and Francesca da Rimini		Private collection	28.9 x 22.8
	Paolo and Francesca da Rimini	1814–20	Barber Institute of Fine Arts, Birmingham	35 x 28
	Roger Freeing Angelica	1819	Louvre, Paris	147 x 190
	Perseus and Andromeda	1819	Detroit Institute of Arts	18.1 x 14.9
	Angelica	1819	La Piscine Museum, Roubaix	102 x 73.7
	Augustus Listening to the Reading of the "Aeneid"	1819	Royal Museums of Fine Arts of Belgium, Brussels	138 x 142
	Don Pedro of Toledo Kissing Henry IV's Sword	1819	Château de Pau, Paris	45.5 x 36.5
	Pope Pius VII attending the Sistine Chapel	1820	Louvre, Paris	69.5 x 55.5
	Jesus Returning the Keys to St. Peter	1820	Musée Ingres, Montauban	280 x 217
	Head of Christ		Private collection	50.2 x 36.8
	Head of Saint John the Evangelist		Metropolitan Museum of Art, New York	39.4 x 27
	Head of Saint Matthew the Evangelist		Louvre, Paris	54.9 x 46
	Don Pedro of Toledo Kissing Henry IV's Sword	1820	Private collection	47.9 x 40
	Portrait of Lorenzo Bartolini	1820	Louvre, Paris	108 x 85.7
	Head of a Jewish Woman		Private collection	21 x 16.5
	The Condottiere	1821	Private collection	50.2 x 40
	The Dauphin's Entry Into Paris	1821	Wadsworth Atheneum, Hartford	47 x 55.9
	Portrait of Mademoiselle Jeanne Gonin	1821	Taft Museum, Cincinnati	76.2 x 60.3
	Portrait of Count Nicolas de Gouriev	1821	Hermitage Museum, St. Petersburg	107 x 86
	Copy of Titian's "Venus of Urbino"	1822	Walters Art Museum, Baltimore	116 x 168
	Portrait of Madame Jacques-Louis Leblanc	1823	Metropolitan Museum of Art, New York	119.4 x 92.7
	Portrait of Jacques-Louis Leblanc	1823	Metropolitan Museum of Art, New York	121 x 95.6
	The Vow of Louis XIII	1824	Montauban Cathedral	421 x 262
	First Thoughts of "The Vow of Louis XIII"	1820–24	Musée Ingres, Montauban	36 x 23
	Portrait of Raphael	1820–24	Musée Ingres, Montauban	43.2 x 34.3

=== Paris (1824–1834) ===
Image	Title	Date	Current location	Dimensions (in cm's)
	The Small Bather	1826	The Phillips Collection, Washington, D.C.	33 x 25
	Portrait of Madame Marcotte de Sainte-Marie	1826	Louvre, Paris	93 x 74
	Portrait of Amédée-David, the Comte de Pastoret	1823–26	Art Institute of Chicago	103 x 83.5
	The Apotheosis of Homer	1827	Louvre, Paris	386 x 515
	The Iliad		Private collection	59 x 53
	The Odyssey		Museum of Fine Arts of Lyon	61 x 55
	Pindar Offering his Lyre to Homer		National Gallery, London	34.9 x 27.9
	The Martyrdom of St Symphorian (Study)	1827	Private collection	34.9 x 29.5
	The Virgin of the Blue Veil	1827	São Paulo Museum of Art	77 x 65
	The Little Bather; Harem interior	1828	Louvre, Paris	35 x 27
	Portrait of King Charles X of France in Coronation Robes	1829	Musée Bonnat, Bayonne	129 x 90
	Don Pedro of Toledo Kissing Henry IV's Sword	1831	Louvre, Paris	36 x 28
	Portrait of Monsieur Bertin	1832	Louvre, Paris	116 x 95
	Head of a Young Woman		Artizon Museum, Tokyo	40.8 x 32.3
	Blessing Christ	1834	São Paulo Museum of Art	80 x 66
	The Martyrdom of Saint Symphorian	1834	Autun Cathedral	407 x 339
	The Martyr, his Mother, the Centurion on Horseback and Other Figures (Study for "The Martyrdom of Saint Symphorian")		Fogg Museum, Cambridge	61.9 x 50.2
	Lictors, Stone Thrower, and Spectator (Study for "The Martyrdom of Saint Symphorian")		Fogg Museum, Cambridge	60 x 49.5
	The Lictor in the Foreground and Other Studies (Study for "The Martyrdom of Saint Symphorian")		Musée Ingres, Montauban	60 x 48.9

=== Rome (1834–1841) ===
Image	Title	Date	Current location	Dimensions (in cm's)
	The Illness of Antiochus	1834	Cleveland Museum of Art	48.1 x 63.9
	Portrait of Louis-Mathieu Molé	1834	Louvre, Paris	147 x 114
	Odalisque in Grisaille	1834	Metropolitan Museum of Art, New York	83.2 x 109.2
	Roger Freeing Angelica	1839	National Gallery, London	47.6 x 39.4
	Odalisque with Slave	1839	Fogg Museum, Cambridge	72.1 x 100.3
	Raphael and the Baker's Daughter	1840	Columbus Museum of Art	35.5 x 27.3
	The Illness of Antiochus	1840	Musée Condé, Chantilly	77 x 61
	Roger Freeing Angelica	1841	Musée Ingres, Montauban	54 x 46
	The Virgin Adoring the Host	1841	Pushkin Museum, Moscow	116 x 84
	Portrait of Luigi Cherubini	1841	Cincinnati Art Museum	83.2 x 71.1

=== Paris (1841–1867) ===
Image	Title	Date	Current location	Dimensions (in cm's)
	Portrait of Luigi Cherubini and the Muse of Lyric Poetry	1834–42	Louvre, Paris	105 x 94
	Odalisque with Slave	1842	Walters Art Museum, Baltimore	76 x 105
	Portrait of the Duke of Orléans	1842	Louvre, Paris	158 x 122
	Portrait of Ferdinand-Philippe d'Orleans	1842	National Gallery, London	54.3 x 45.1
	Portrait of Ferdinand-Philippe d'Orleans	1843	Palace of Versailles	154 x 119
	Portrait of Ferdinand-Philippe d'Orleans	1843	Perpignan Museum	154 x 119
	Portrait of Ferdinand-Philippe d'Orleans	1844	Wadsworth Atheneum, Hartford	72.1 x 40
	Portrait of Ferdinand-Philippe d'Orleans	1844	Palace of Versailles	218 x 131
	Saint Louis, roi de France	1844	Louvre, Paris	210 x 92
	Portrait of Edmond Cavé	1844	Metropolitan Museum of Art, New York	40.6 x 32.7
	Portrait of Madame Edmond Cavé	1844	Metropolitan Museum of Art, New York	40.6 x 32.7
	Portrait of Comtesse d'Haussonville	1845	Frick Collection, New York	131.8 x 92
	Portrait of Augustine-Modeste-Hortense Reiset	1846	Fogg Museum, Cambridge	62 x 49.5
	Aretino and Charles V's Ambassador	1848	Museum of Fine Arts of Lyon	41.5 x 32.5
	Aretino in the Studio of Tintoretto	1848	Metropolitan Museum of Art, New York	44.2 x 35.9
	Venus Anadyomene	1848	Musée Condé, Chantilly	164 x 82
	Portrait of Baronne de Rothschild	1848	Private collection	141.9 x 101
	Eros		Kunstmuseum Basel	32 diameter
	Juno		Krannert Art Museum, Champaign	32 diameter
	Mars		Kunstmuseum Basel	32 x 31
	Minerva		Wallraf–Richartz Museum, Cologne	32 diameter
	Jupiter and Antiope	1851	Musée d'Orsay, Paris	32.5 x 43.5
	Portrait of Madame Inés Moitessier	1851	National Gallery of Art, Washington, D.C.	148 x 101.6
	The Virgin Adoring the Host	1852	Metropolitan Museum of Art, New York	40.3 x 32.7
	Portrait of Madame Gonse	1852	Musée Ingres, Montauban	73 x 62
	Apotheosis of Napoleon I	1853	Petit Palais, Paris	62 x 62
	The Princesse de Broglie	1853	Metropolitan Museum of Art, New York	121.3 x 90.9
	Joan of Arc at the Coronation of Charles VII	1854	Louvre, Paris	240 x 178
	The Virgin Adoring the Host	1854	Louvre, Paris	113 diameter
	St. Germaine Cousin of Pibrac	1856	Église Saint-Étienne de Sapiac, Montauban	186 x 115.9
	The Source	1820–56	Musée d'Orsay, Paris	163 x 80
	Portrait of Madame Moitessier	1856	National Gallery, London	121.3 x 90.9
	Molière at the Table of Louis XIV at Versailles	1857	Comédie-Française, Paris	47.9 x 66
	Virgin of the Adoption	1858	National Gallery of Victoria, Melbourne	69.5 x 56.8
	Self-Portrait at Seventy-Eight	1858	Uffizi, Florence	62 x 51
	Roger Freeing Angelica	1859	São Paulo Museum of Art	97 x 75
	Virgin with the Crown	1859	Private collection	66.9 x 50.8
	Portrait of Madame Ingres	1859	Am Römerholz, Winterthur	65 x 53
	The Virgin with the Host	1860	Private collection	60 x 46
	The Golden Age	1862	Fogg Museum, Cambridge	47.9 x 61.9
	Jesus among the Doctors	1862	Musée Ingres, Montauban	265 x 320
	Study for "Jesus among the Doctors"		Musée Ingres, Montauban	59 x 45
	The Turkish Bath	1862	Louvre, Paris	108 x 110
	Oedipus and the Sphinx	1864	Walters Art Museum, Baltimore	105.5 x 87
	Self-Portrait	1864	Royal Museum of Fine Arts Antwerp	96.7 x 86
	The Martyrdom of Saint Symphorian	1865	Philadelphia Museum of Art	36.5 x 31.5
	Virgil Reading from the Aeneid		Private collection	61 x 49.8

== Sources ==
- Wildenstein, Georges, ‘’Ingres’’. London: Phaidon Press, 1954.
