= Henry IV Receiving the Spanish Ambassador =

Painting by Jean-Auguste-Dominique Ingres

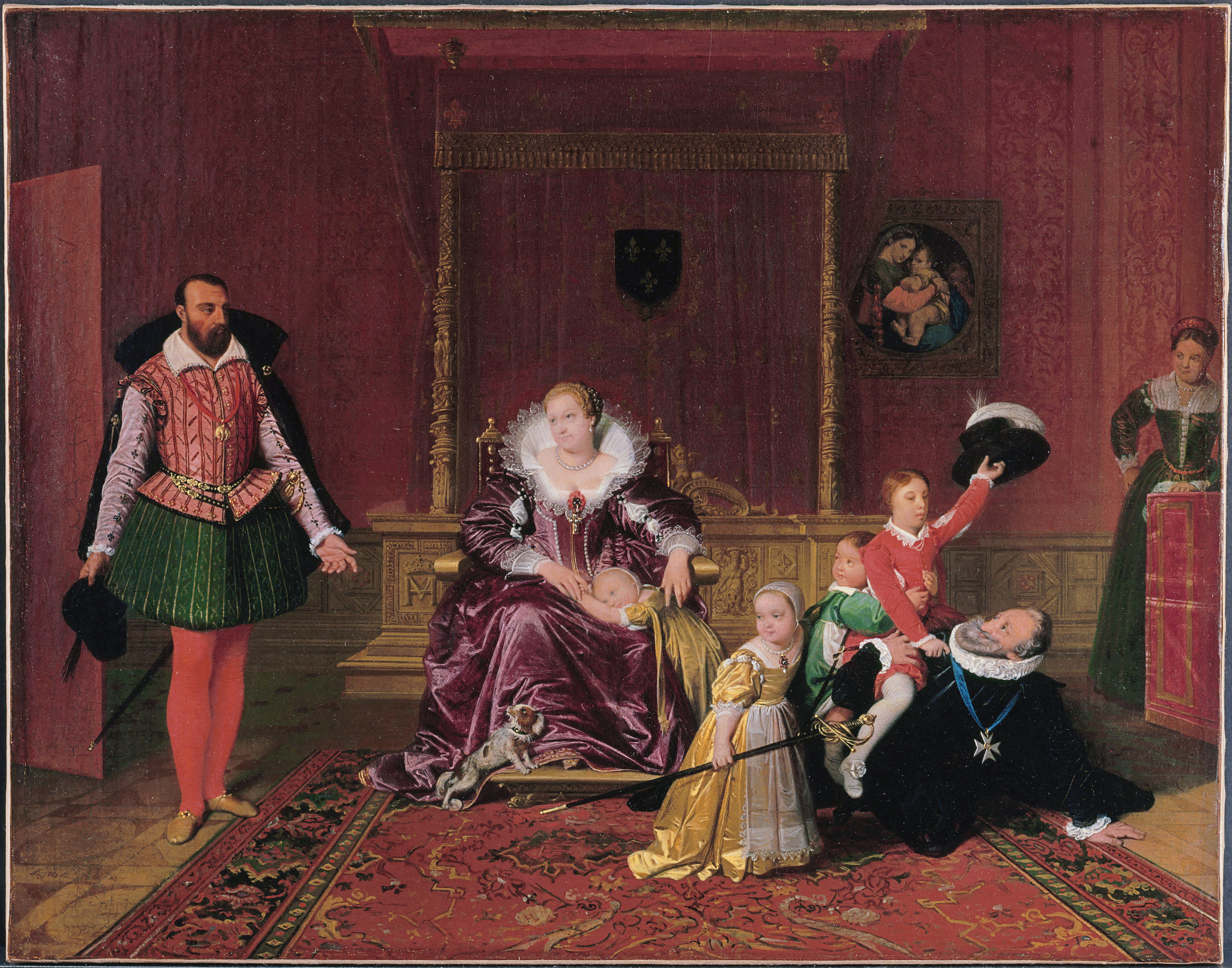
Henry IV Receiving the Spanish Ambassador (1817) by Ingres

Henry IV Receiving the Spanish Ambassador is an oil-on-canvas painting in the Troubador style by the French painter Jean-Auguste-Dominique Ingres, executed in 1817. It depicts Henry IV of France playing with his children whilst receiving the Spanish ambassador, with Marie de Medici seated at the centre.

It is now in the Petit Palais, Paris. It was shown in the 2014 exhibition L'invention du Passé. Histoires de cœur et d'épée 1802–1850. at the musée des beaux-arts de Lyon.

== See also ==
- List of paintings by Jean-Auguste-Dominique Ingres
