= Portrait of Madame Duvaucey =

Painting by Jean-Auguste-Dominique Ingres

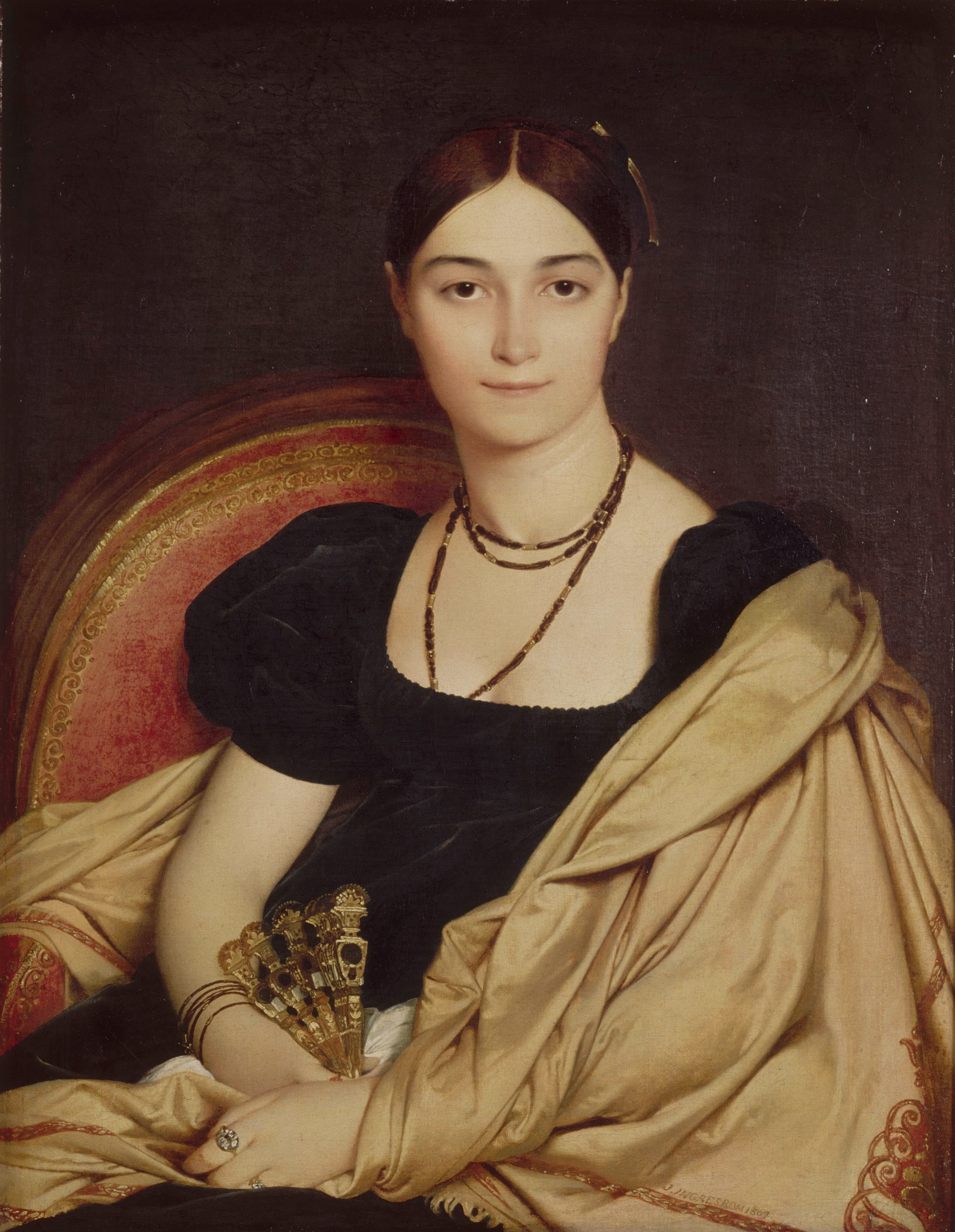
Portrait of Madame Duvaucey, 76 x 59 cm. Jean-Auguste-Dominique Ingres

Portrait of Madame Duvaucey is an 1807 oil on canvas painting by Jean-Auguste-Dominique Ingres. It shows Antonia Duvauçey of Nittis, the lover of Charles-Jean-Marie Alquier, then ambassador to the Holy See. Duvaucey is positioned in a flat pictorial space, gazing frontally at the viewer, dressed in lavish clothing and accessories. The portrait is the first female portrait painted during the artist's stay in Rome. Portrait of Madame Duvaucey is acclaimed for exhibiting her enigmatic charm, and as "not a portrait that gives pleasure..[but]...a portrait that gives rise to dreams".

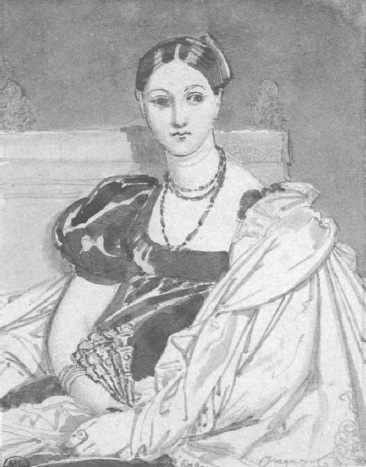
Ingres, Study for a Portrait of Madame Duvaucey. Graphite and black chalk.

Duvaucey stares out directly at the viewer with a sly and suggestive smile. Set against a flat grey background, the perspective of the portrait is very shallow overall. It is framed by the inwards swoops of the cured rose and gold Louis XVI chair, and embroidered pale yellow and red silk shawl. She holds an expensive-looking fan, and is adorned with three partly visible rings, an elegant thin necklace and elephant hair bracelets.

Typical of Ingres' female portraits, her anatomy seems almost boneless. Her arms are out of proportion, with her left arm, at the viewer's right, far longer than her right. Her neck is too elongated and doesn't seem strong enough to support her head. In a prelude to his later "Odalisque" paintings, her facial features seem almost arabesque. The contemporary critic Théophile Gautier wrote of her that "there is no woman that M. Ingres has painted, but the likeness of the ancient Chimera, in Empire dress.

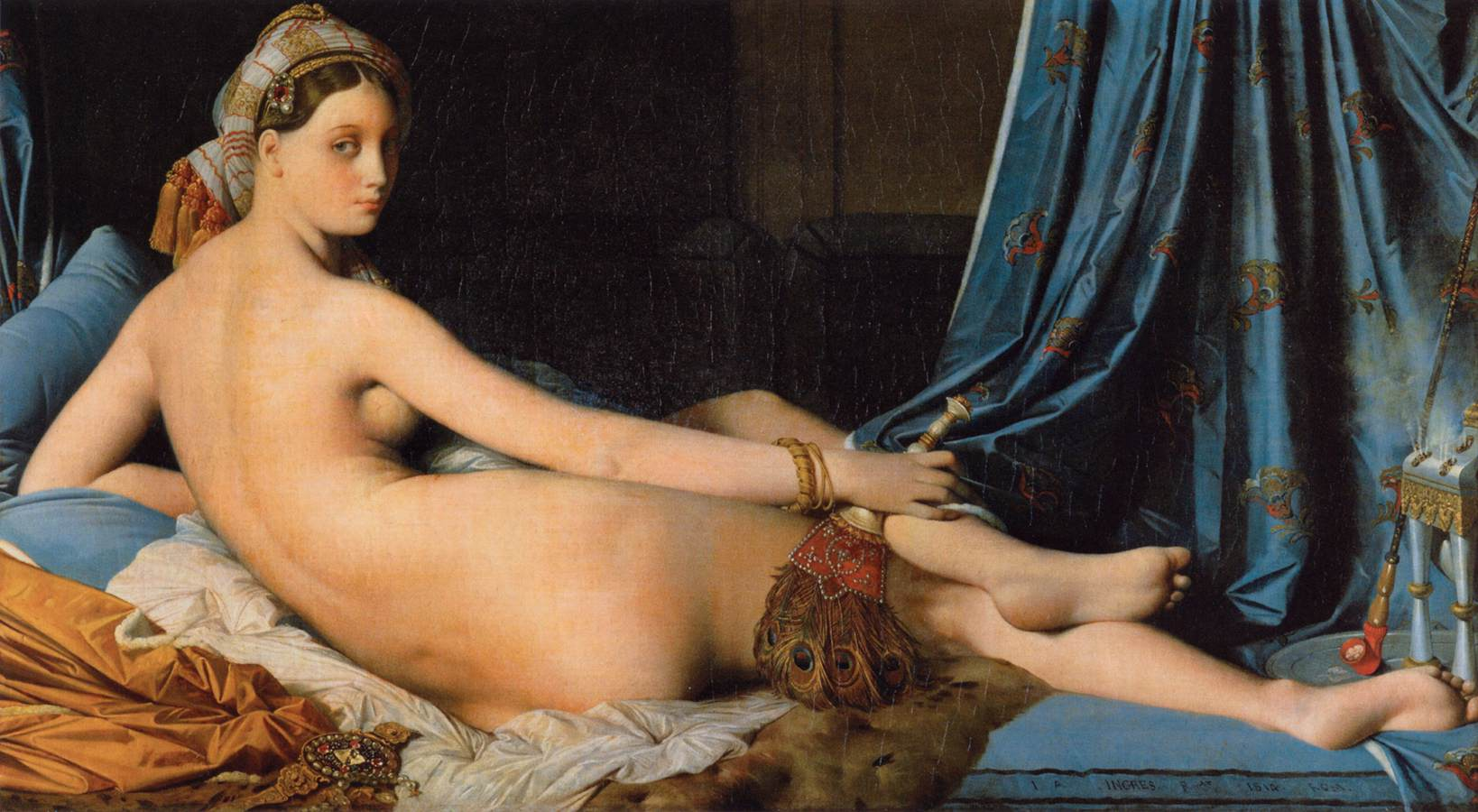
Grande Odalisque, 1814

Ingres was paid 500 francs for the commission. It was exhibited at the Salon of 1833 and again in 1855, and while one critic complained of its "dry, shadow-less quality, and..the defective anatomy", the painting was a huge success - his most acclaimed at the 1833 Salon- and drew critical and popular admiration. Ingres was widely praised, especially for his skill with line and his "religion of form". It is today seen as groundbreaking in the development of portraiture.

Forty years after its completion, Duvaucey urgently needed money and visited Ingres in Paris to sell the painting. Ingres recognised her, and found a buyer in Fredric Reisit, whose collection became the Musée Condé, Chantilly where the painting remains today.

== See also ==
- List of paintings by Jean-Auguste-Dominique Ingres
