= The Odyssey (painting) =

Painting by Jean-Auguste-Dominique Ingres

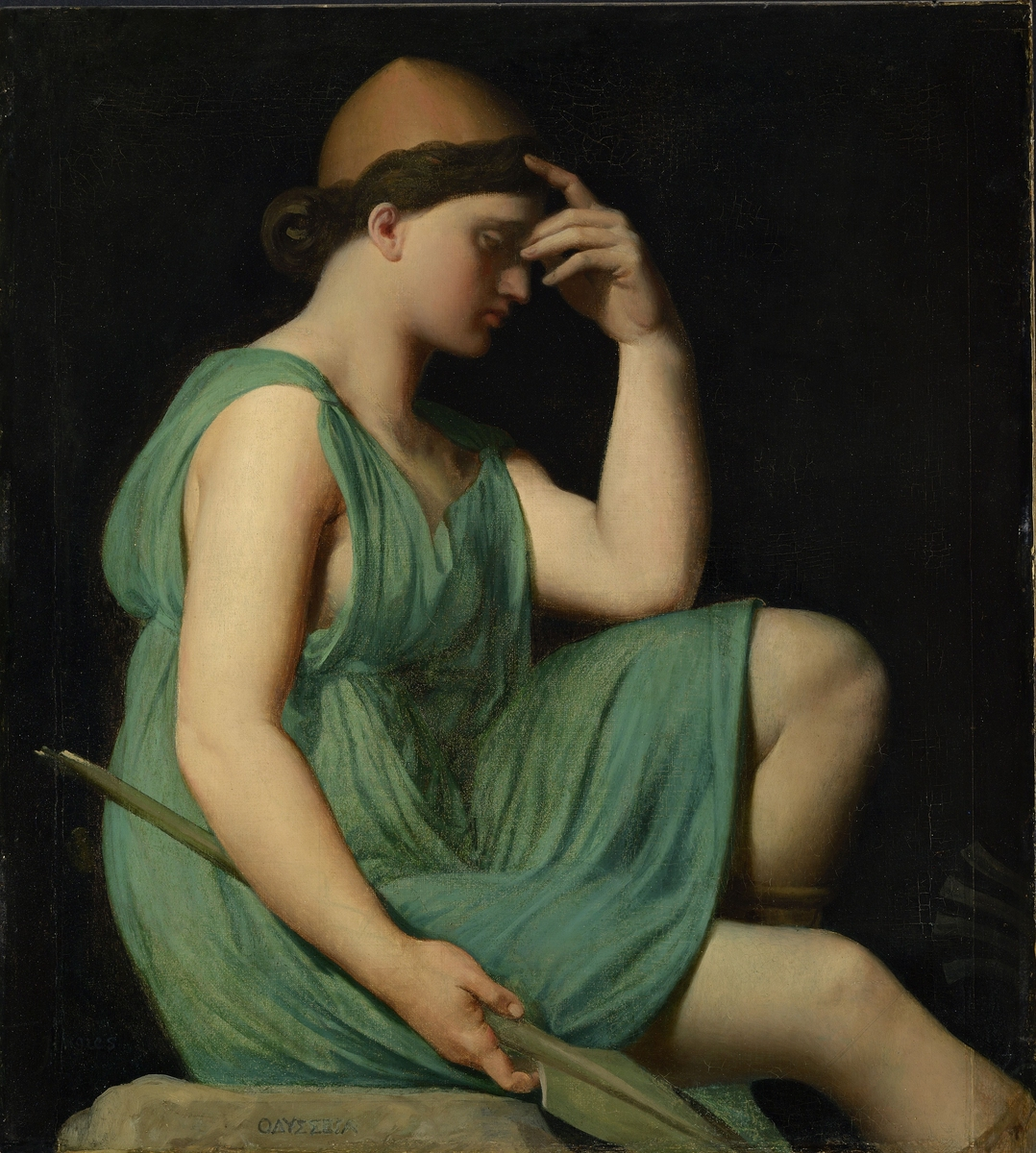
The Odyssey (1850) by Ingres

The Odyssey is an 1850 painting by the French artist Jean Auguste Dominique Ingres, showing a female personification of the eponymous poem by Homer. It is now in the Museum of Fine Arts of Lyon.

== History of the work ==
This work is a personification of the Odyssey, an ancient Greek epic attributed to the bard Homer. It is considered one of the greatest masterpieces of literature and, along with the Iliad, one of the two founding poems of European civilization.

The woman painted by Ingres is a personification of the Odyssey and originally featured in another of his works, The Apotheosis of Homer (1827).

The Odyssey was bequeathed to the Museum of Fine Arts in Lyon by Joseph Gillet in 1923.

== See also ==
- List of paintings by Jean-Auguste-Dominique Ingres
