= Don Pedro of Toledo Kissing Henry IV's Sword =

Paintings by Jean-Auguste-Dominique Ingres

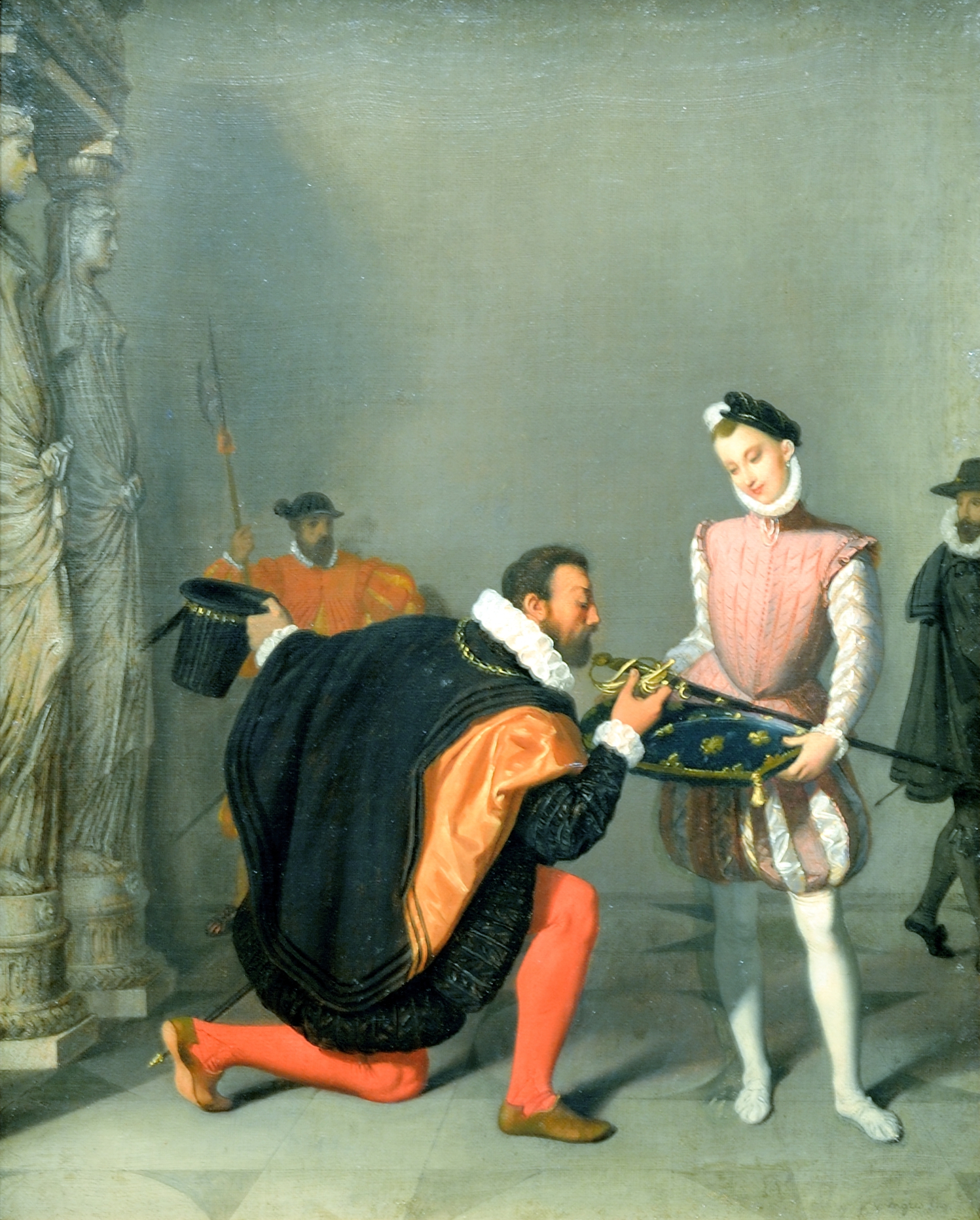
Don Pedro of Toledo Kissing Henry IV's Sword, 1819 version, château de Pau

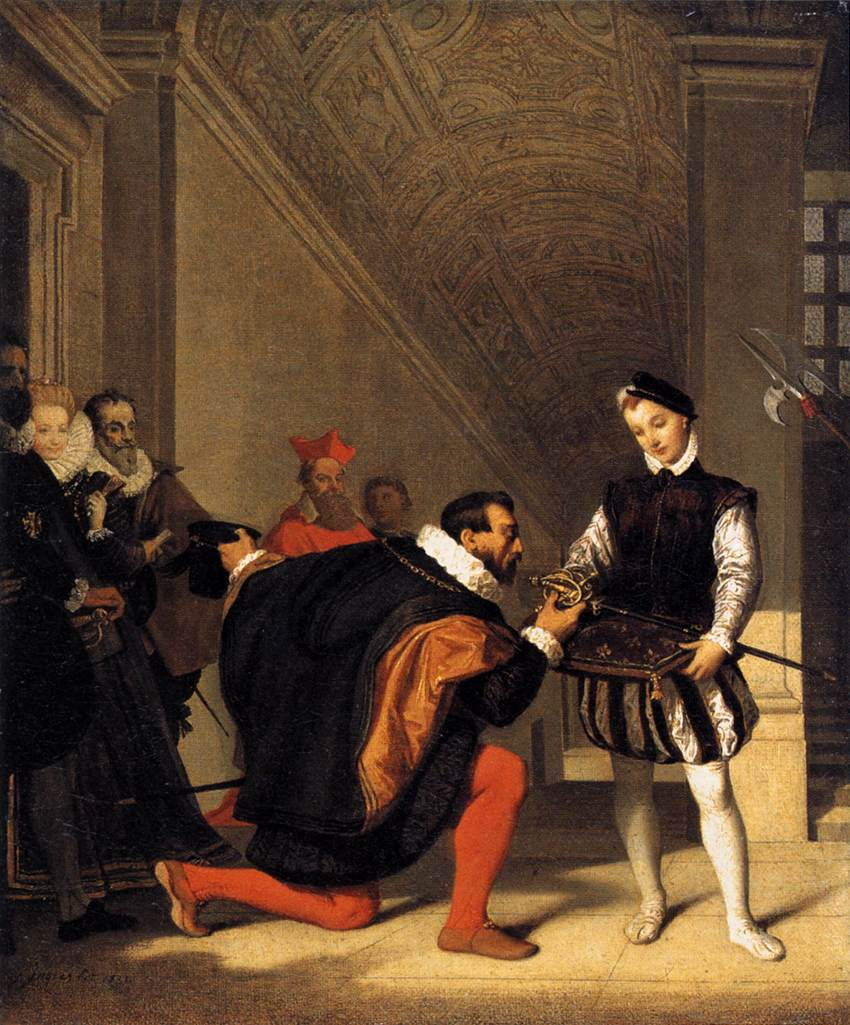
Don Pedro of Toledo Kissing Henry IV's Sword, 1832, the Louvre

Don Pedro of Toledo Kissing Henry IV's Sword was originally a painting of 1814 in the Troubador style by the French artist Jean-Auguste-Dominique Ingres, showing the Spanish ambassador Pedro Álvarez de Toledo, 5th Marquis of Villafranca kissing the sword of Henry IV of France (held by a young page) in the salle des Caryatides of the Louvre Palace. The 1814 painting is now lost. Between 1819 and 1832, Ingres painted three additional versions of the subject.

== History ==
Episodes from the life of Henri IV were a frequent subject for French painters in Ingres' time. The incident depicted in this painting was described by Ingres in one of his notebooks:

One day Don Pedro of Toledo, the Ambassador of Spain to the court of Henri IV, saw in the Louvre the sword of the King in the hands of a young page. Advancing, he knelt on the ground and kissed it, rendering honor, he said, to the most glorious sword in Christendom.

The artist painted four versions of the subject between 1814 and 1832.

The original version was painted in 1814 and exhibited at the Paris Salon that year, where it was disparaged by critics. After even Ingres' friends found fault with it, Ingres reworked it in 1820. The revised composition included the figures of the Duc d'Épernon and Gabrielle d'Estrées behind the ambassador and the page. The location of the painting since the mid-19th century is unknown. The composition of the painting before its revision is recorded in an engraving by Achille Réveil published in 1851.

A second version (1819; now at the château de Pau) was painted for Ingres' friend, the artist Jean Alaux. It closely replicates the initial composition of the 1814 version: In the background at the left stands a guard; an unidentified figure is exiting at the right. This version was displayed in the 2014 exhibition L'invention du Passé. Histoires de cœur et d'épée 1802–1850 at the musée des beaux-arts de Lyon.

In the third painting (1820; acquired for the Louvre Abu Dhabi in 2009), Ingres moved the row of caryatids from the left edge of the composition to the center, and reversed the angle of the perspective. The figures of the Duc d'Épernon and Gabrielle d'Estrées are once again in the background at the left. The painting was previously in a private collection in Oslo.

The fourth version (1832; acquired by the Louvre Museum in 1981) is slightly smaller than the others. The setting is changed from the Salle des Caryatides to the Stairway of Henri II, and the number of onlookers is augmented by the inclusion of the poet François de Malherbe, Cardinal Jacques Davy Duperron, and an unidentified man.

== See also ==
- List of paintings by Jean-Auguste-Dominique Ingres
