= Portrait of Paul Lemoyne =

Painting by Jean-Auguste-Dominique Ingres

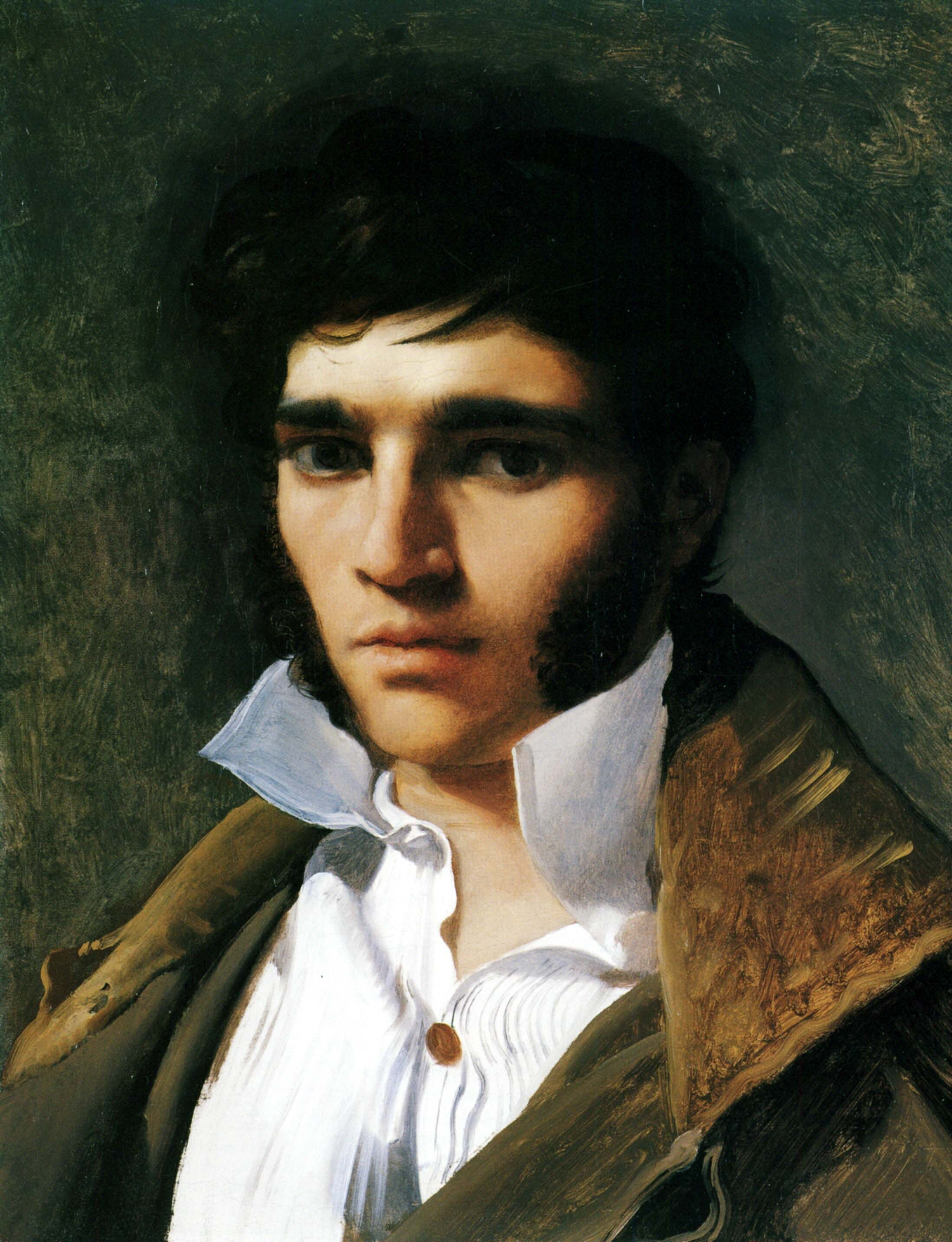
Ingres, Portrait of Paul Lemoyne, 1810–11

Portrait of Paul Lemoyne is an oil on canvas painting by the French Neoclassical artist Jean-Auguste-Dominique Ingres, completed between 1810 and 1811. It his held at the Nelson-Atkins Museum of Art, Kansas City. The model is Paul Lemoyne (1784–1883), a French sculptor, who visited Ingres during his first stay in Rome, when this portrait was executed. He is depicted as youthful, dashing, fiery, dark and handsome. Lemoyne is shown in an unguarded and informal pose, suggesting that the work completed as a gift for a friend rather than as a paid commission. The dark black and green background seems splashed on, and serves to accentuate the subject's dark facial features and black hair. Lemoyne looks disheveled, with rough hair and open shirt collars.

== See also ==
- List of paintings by Jean-Auguste-Dominique Ingres

== Sources ==
- Tinterow, Gary. Portraits by Ingres: Image of an Epoch. New York: Metropolitan Museum of Art, 1999. ISBN 978-0-300-08653-9

== Links ==
- Painting in the collection of The Nelson-Atkins Museum of Art
