= The Martyrdom of Saint Symphorian =

Painting by Jean-Auguste-Dominique Ingres

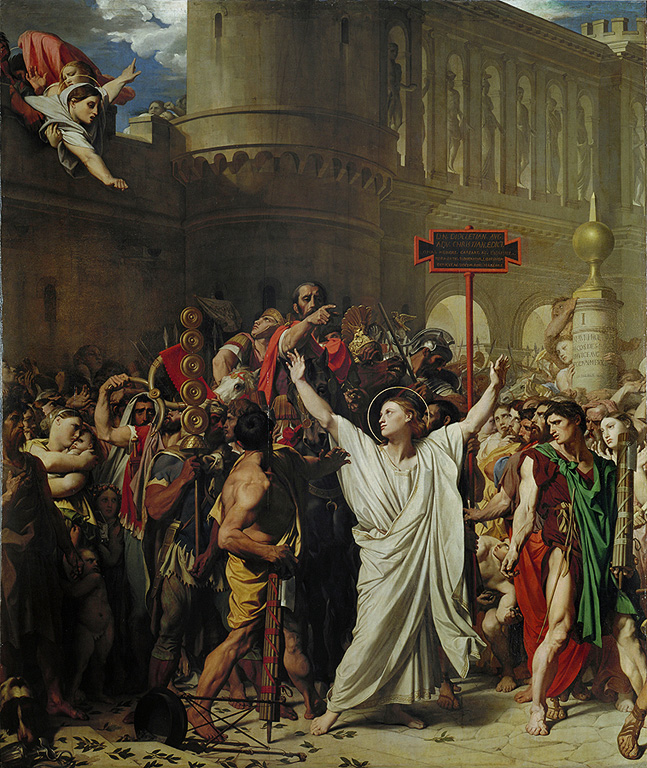
The Martyrdom of Saint Symphorian, 1834, oil on canvas, Autun Cathedral

The Martyrdom of Saint Symphorian is an 1834 painting by the French artist Jean-Auguste-Dominique Ingres. It shows the death of Saint Symphorian, the first Christian martyr in Gaul. Painted in oil on canvas and measuring 407 x 339 cm, it is now in Autun Cathedral. Although Ingres considered the painting—completed only after ten years of diligent work—one of his crowning achievements, it was criticized harshly when he exhibited it in the Paris Salon of 1834. It subsequently has been considered emblematic of Ingres' ambition to excel as a history painter.

== Background ==
Frustrated during the early part of his career by the need to paint portraits to earn a living, Ingres was determined to make his reputation in the more prestigious genre of history painting, which he considered to be his true calling. His ambition was fulfilled when his The Vow of Louis XIII achieved a triumphant success at the Salon of 1824. The painting's calm classicism—which testified to Ingres' close study of Raphael and other old masters—presented a challenge to the rising popularity of the romantic style exemplified by Eugène Delacroix. The critics came to regard Ingres as the standard-bearer of classicism against the romantic school—a role he relished. Honors came his way; in January 1825 he was awarded the Cross of the Légion d'honneur by Charles X, and in June 1825 he was elected to the Institute.

During the period from 1824 to 1834 he painted few portraits, and concentrated on history painting. He received several important commissions for such works, such as the monumental The Apotheosis of Homer, commissioned in 1826.

== Commission ==
Studies for the Martyrdom of Saint Symphorian, oil on canvas, Musée Ingres

The Martyrdom of Saint Symphorian was commissioned in December 1824 by the bishop of Autun, Monsignor de Vichy. It was intended to replace an altarpiece by Fra Bartolomeo (The Marriage of Saint Catherine; 1511) that had been confiscated to Paris during the Revolution. The subject of Ingres' painting was a youth who was beheaded ca. 160–179 by for refusing to worship a pagan idol. Monsignor de Vichy gave Ingres a detailed program to follow in composing his picture, which Ingres followed closely. The painting depicts the Roman proconsul Heraclius and his guards seizing Saint Symphorian and ordering him to prostrate himself in the temple of the pagan goddess Cybele, or be killed. The saint's mother, overlooking the scene from the city wall above, urges him to have faith and face death gladly. He gives her a heartening look.

Ingres began work on the project with the hope of finishing the painting in time to exhibit it in the Salon of 1827, but the work proceeded slowly. He prepared the composition in all its details with his usual care, ultimately producing more than 200 preparatory drawings and at least eleven studies in oils. He had not yet resolved the composition by the time of the July Revolution of 1830. Unsettled by the revolution, Ingres abandoned work on the project for a time, but by 1833 had returned to it with renewed vigor. The art historian Susan L. Siegfried contrasts the figure studies datable before 1830 with those made after the July Revolution, such as the two oil studies in the Fogg Art Museum (1833), in which "Ingres incorporated all of the passion of his own reaction to the social upheaval" and gave emphasis to "the energy of the mob, painting a moral lesson for the public he abhorred".

In addition to numerous drawings from live models, Ingres' research for the painting included much study of Renaissance and Baroque masters (Ingres spoke of "devouring Michelangelo"). He traveled to Autun in 1826 to examine the remnants of the city wall. He had wooden models made of the accessories held or worn by the figures, and painted from them. The painting was completed in time for the March 1 opening date of the Salon of 1834.

== Reception ==
Ingres wished to present The Martyrdom of Saint Symphorian as his masterpiece and as the result of wide research, but it was a critical failure when it was exhibited at the Salon. Ingres' friends and admirers had only faint praise for it, while his detractors harshly criticized the congested composition and anatomical exaggerations. The critic Gabriel Laviron wrote that "many figures would gain by being cut out and separately framed", while Armand-Denis Vergnaud deplored the "muscles seen through a magnifying glass, strained, inflated out of place and proportion to the bodies and limbs on which they are nailed". When the length of the arms of the saint's mother was criticized, Ingres indignantly replied that "the arms of a mother who blesses her son marching to death are never too long."

The cool reception given his painting was made all the more galling by the critical success at the same Salon of Delacroix and Paul Delaroche, who displayed "large-scale figure pieces of less than the most elevated subjects", in the words of Marjorie Cohn. Ingres' irritation may have been further exacerbated by the hanging of his work below a painting depicting "four or five life-sized cows returning to their stable". The result was that Ingres resolved never again to exhibit at the Salon or to accept any public commissions. He applied for and received a position as director of the French Academy in Rome, and left Paris in December 1834 to begin a self-imposed exile in Italy. He did not return to France until 1841. In November 1834 The Martyrdom of Saint Symphorian was installed in Autun Cathedral.

== Legacy ==
Although Ingres remained firm in his belief that The Martyrdom of Saint Symphorian was one of his supreme achievements, it has traditionally been counted among his least successful works. In 1889 Paul Mantz declared the painting "confused, emotionless and devoid of light. The future will be astonished at the excessive interest that our fathers attached to this composition, a work of ill digested Italianism." In 1950 Jean Alazard said: "To tell the truth, the painting is not worth more than the magnificent execution of its parts". The French art critic Pierre Schneider wrote in 1969 that the painting was "absurd" and exemplified "Ingres' phenomenal misjudgment of his capacities: those of a miniaturist haunted by heroic formats".

More appreciative was Avigdor Arikha, who said "there is a marvelous contrast between the static architecture and the swarming movements of the people in the foreground that makes us think of Bronzino."

In contrast to the critical judgment of the painting, the many preparatory drawings and oil studies associated with the painting are highly regarded. When the oil studies were displayed publicly for the first time at a memorial exhibition in 1867, they greatly impressed Gautier, who said "one stands stupified before these ... masterpieces", which reminded him of Greek antique fragments he had seen in Athens. Of the chalk drawing Three Men on Horseback (Nelson-Atkins Museum of Art), Agnes Mongan and Hans Naef wrote: "Probably the artist worked on the painting too long and too hard, for the finished work has none of the impact, freedom and majestic poise of these figures, and no echo of the brilliant light which plays on them."

Ingres painted a greatly reduced replica of the painting in 1865 (in the Philadelphia Museum of Art).

== See also ==
- List of paintings by Jean-Auguste-Dominique Ingres

== Bibliography ==
- Arikha, Avigdor (1986). J.A.D. Ingres: Fifty Life Drawings from the Musée Ingres at Montauban. Houston: The Museum of Fine Arts. ISBN 0-89090-036-1
- Cohn, Marjorie B.; Siegfried, Susan L. (1980). Works by J.-A.-D. Ingres in the Collection of the Fogg Art Museum. Cambridge, Mass.: Fogg Art Museum, Harvard Univ. OCLC 6762670
- Condon, Patricia; Cohn, Marjorie B.; Mongan, Agnes (1983). In Pursuit of Perfection: The Art of J.-A.-D. Ingres. Louisville: The J. B. Speed Art Museum. ISBN 0-9612276-0-5
- Ingres, J.-A.-D., Musée Ingres, & Victoria and Albert Museum. (1979). Ingres, Drawings from the Musée Ingres at Montauban and Other Collections. London: Arts Council of Great Britain. ISBN 0-7287-0204-5
- Mongan, Agnes; Naef, Dr. Hans (1967). Ingres Centennial Exhibition 1867-1967: Drawings, Watercolors, and Oil Sketches from American Collections. Greenwich, Conn.: Distributed by New York Graphic Society. OCLC 170576
- Radius, Emilio (1968). L'opera completa di Ingres. Milan: Rizzoli. OCLC 58818848
- Rosenblum, Robert (1986). Ingres. Paris, Cercle d'Art, coll. "La Bibliothèque des Grands Peintres", 1986 (ISBN 2-7022-0192-X)
- Siegfried, S. L., & Rifkin, A. (2001). Fingering Ingres. Oxford: Blackwell. ISBN 0-631-22526-9
- Ternois, Daniel (1980). Ingres. Paris, Fernand Nathan. (ISBN 2-09-284-557-8)
- Tinterow, Gary; Conisbee, Philip; Naef, Hans (1999). Portraits by Ingres: Image of an Epoch. New York: Harry N. Abrams, Inc. ISBN 0-8109-6536-4
