= The Half-Length Bather =

1807 painting by Jean-Auguste-Dominique Ingres

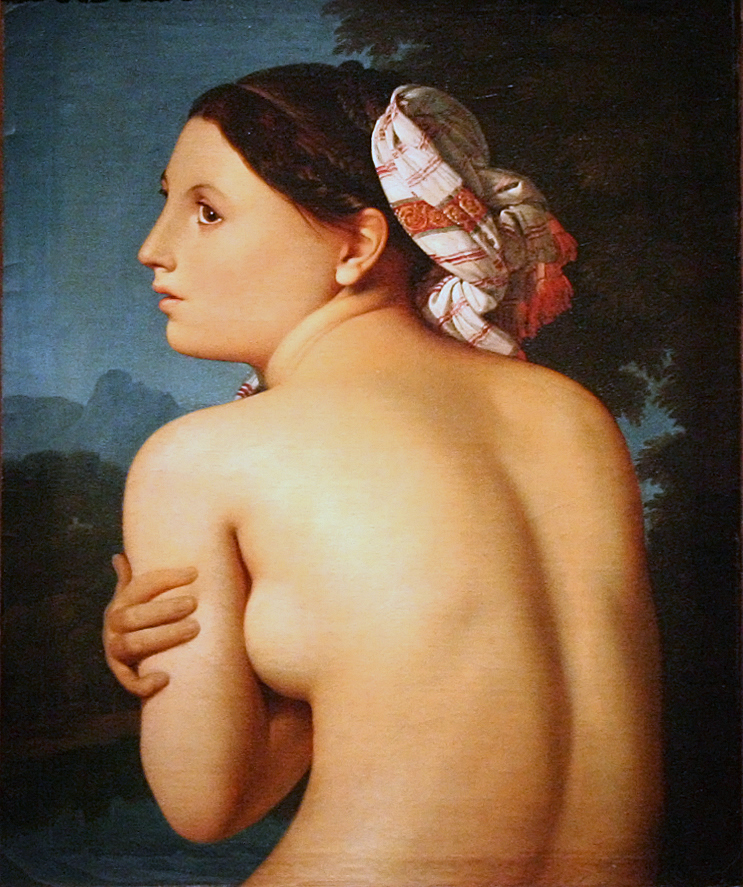
The Half-Length Bather (1807) by Ingres

The Half-Length Bather (French: La Baigneuse à mi-corps) is an 1807 painting by the French artist Jean-Auguste-Dominique Ingres. It is now in the Musée Bonnat in Bayonne.

It is one of his first female nudes. It is notable for the contrast between the realism in the depiction of the turban with the abstract treatment of the woman's back.

== See also ==
- List of paintings by Jean-Auguste-Dominique Ingres
