= Self-Portrait at Seventy-Eight (Ingres) =

1858 painting by Jean-Auguste-Dominique Ingres

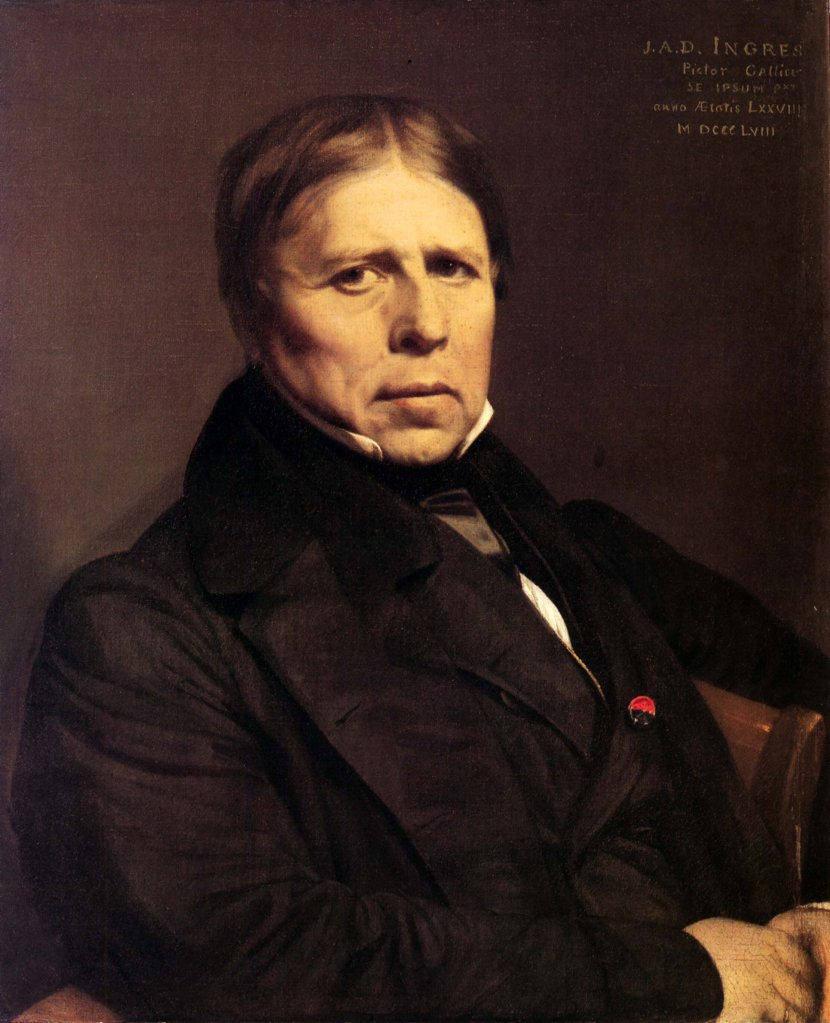
Self-Portrait at Seventy-Eight, 1858

Self-Portrait at Seventy-Eight is an 1858 oil-on-canvas painting by the French Neoclassical artist Jean-Auguste-Dominique Ingres. It is one of the last of his many portraits, which he had always regarded as bothersome distractions from his true calling, history painting. The painting measures 24 3/8 x 20 1/8 inches (62 x 51 cm) and is in the Uffizi Gallery, Florence.

The self-portrait is renowned for its honest treatment of the physical effects of old age. Ingres' expression is foreboding and intense, and he is tightly wrapped in stiff military-like clothes. The work was painted at a point when Ingres, owing to age, could no longer commit to society portraits, which typically took him 4-5 years to complete. Ingres lived a further nine years, dying on 14 January 1867, aged 86.

== History ==
In 1839 the director of the Uffizi, Antonio Ramirez di Montalvo, sent Ingres a letter requesting the donation of a painting of himself for the museum's gallery of self-portraits of great artists. Ingres demurred, believing that his obligations as director of the French Academy in Rome—and the work he was just beginning on Cherubini and the Muse of Lyric Poetry—would leave him no time to undertake the self-portrait. In 1855 Montalvo's successor, Marchese Luca Bourbon del Monte, renewed the request; this time Ingres felt able to oblige. On 20 March 1858, Ingres reported to Bourbon del Monte that he had completed the portrait. His letter reads in part:

I beg you, Monsieur le Directeur, to accept all my excuses and regret for not complying sooner to the request that you so kindly addressed to me. But I have just completed my portrait, finally, and I am ready to send it to you. However, I wanted to make this portrait simple and humble so that the great Painters among whom I am about to sit will not accuse me of prideful temerity.

In the first known instance of Ingres using a photograph as his primary source for a portrait, he modelled the painting on a photograph of ca. 1855 by Gerothwohl and Tanner. The painting was likely completed with the assistance of unidentified collaborators, though the passages describing his face can only have come from his hand.

== Description ==
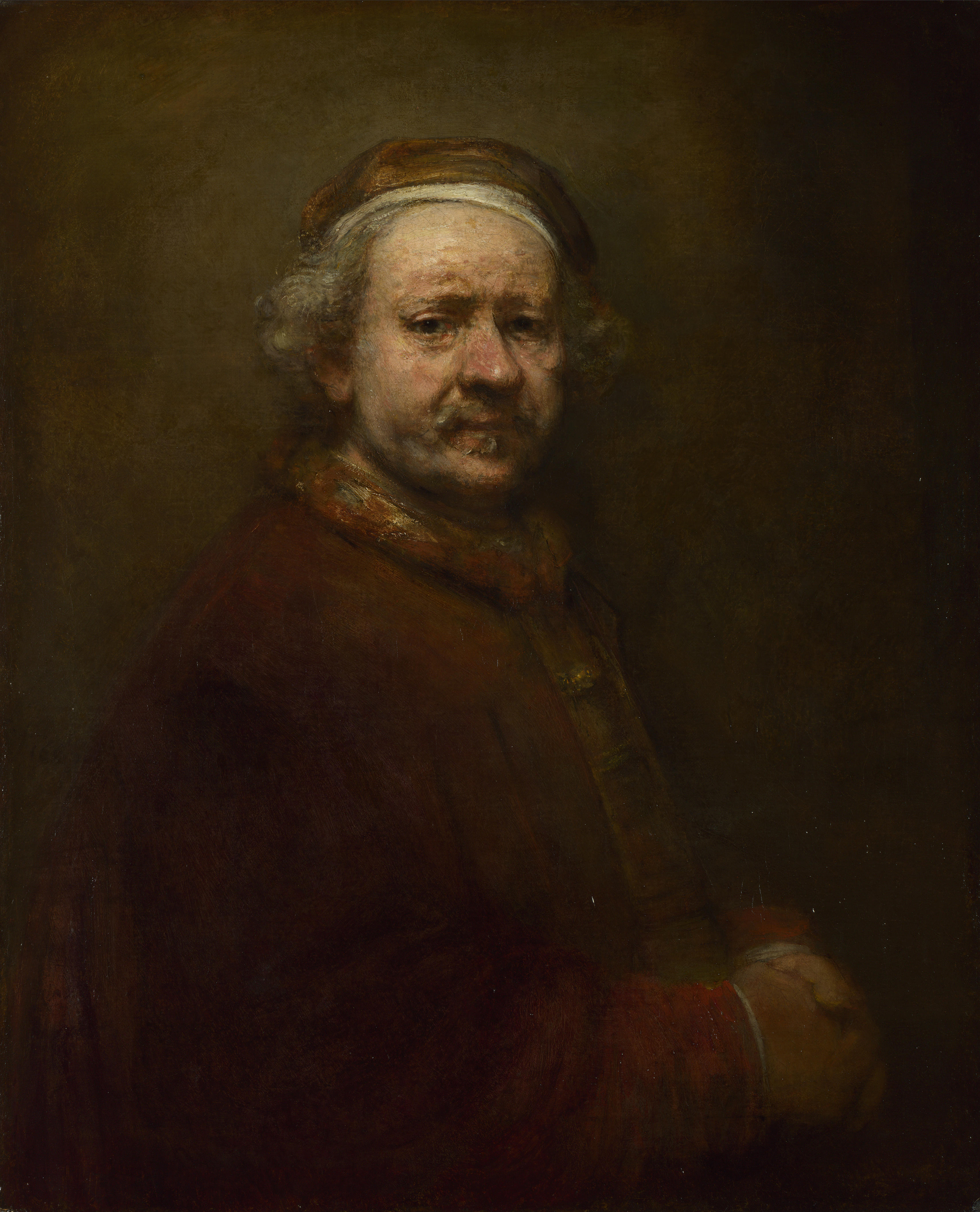
Rembrandt, Self-portrait at the age of 63, 1669. National Gallery, London

The self-portrait is brutally honest and mostly bereft of vanity; as a study of old age, it goes beyond even his Portrait of Monsieur Bertin, which he deliberately invokes. As always, Ingres took Raphael as his stylistic ideal. The 1669 self-portrait by Rembrandt, an artist Ingres generally held in low regard, has been suggested as an influence as well.

Ingres presents himself in half-bust view, dressed in clothing that suggests a cultivated, rich, well-travelled, and influential man. He is slimmer in the painting than he was in real life at the time, and wears an evening dress uniform that reflects his status as grand officer in Napoleon's Legion of Honour. Although Ingres appears aged and troubled, the portrait contains hints of optimism; he had been widowed but had recovered and was happily married to his second wife Dominique Rame, and could look back on a commercially successful if not artistically fulfilling career.

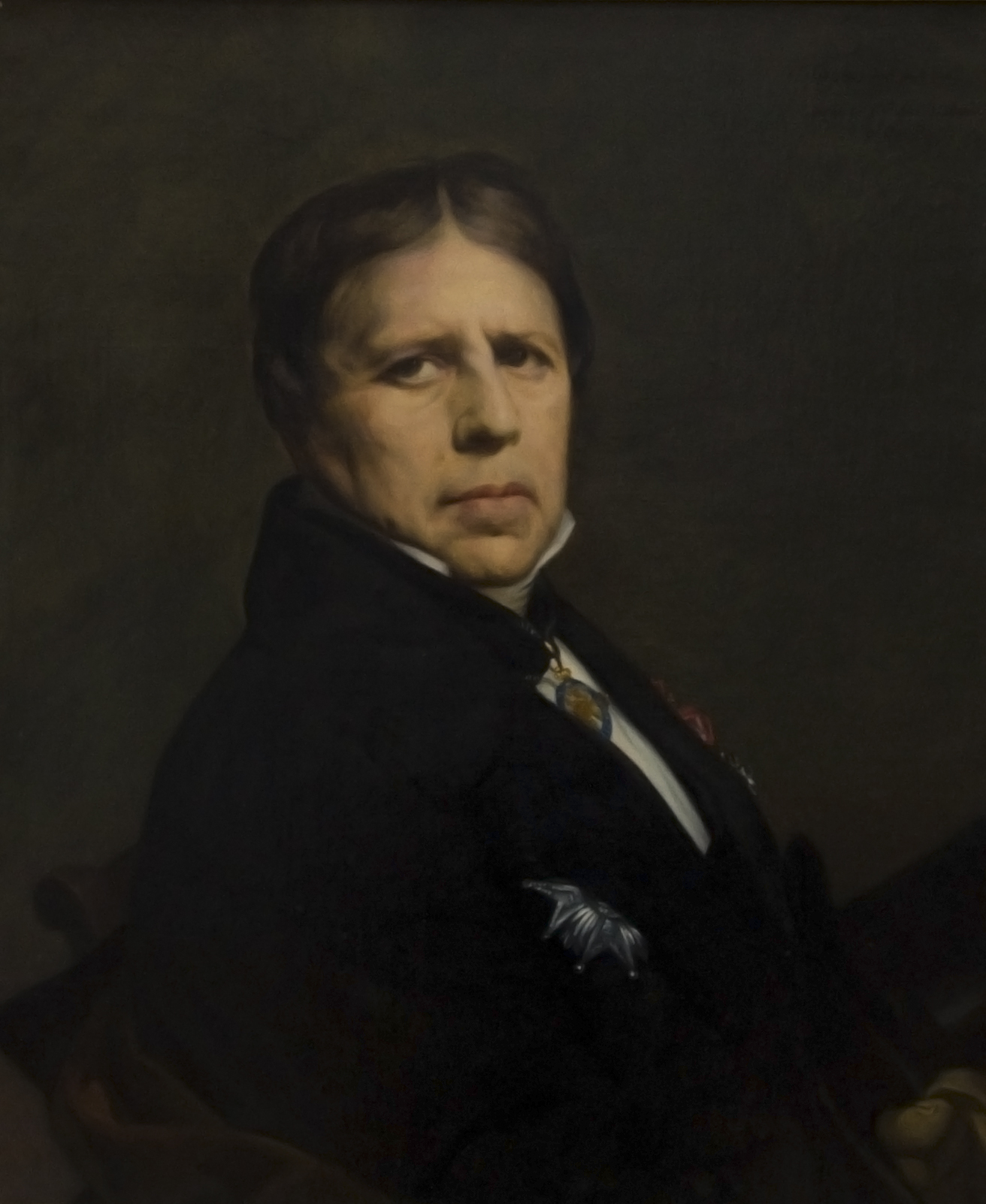
Self-Portrait, 1864–65, Royal Museum of Fine Arts Antwerp

He gives himself a grim expression, with a downturned mouth, which art historians view as overstating his existential view – extant photographs from the period show him almost, or about to, smile, and his letters from this period reflect a degree of contentment. His expression is often interpreted by modern art historians as conflicted, troubled and bad-tempered, the reflection of a frustrated history painter at the end of a career spent largely on society painting.

The painting was widely praised when first exhibited, and is today considered one of the finest examples of self-portraiture in art history. It is often compared to Rembrandt's later self-portraits, although Ingres's work contains hints of vanity that the older master's did not; Ingres has smoothed out his skin and has more and darker grey hair than contemporary photographs suggest.

Ingres painted two variant copies of the portrait. One was completed in 1859, when Ingres reworked an octagonal, oil-on-paper sketch he had made for the Uffizi portrait. By mounting it on a rectangular canvas, he made it into a pendant for his Portrait of Madame Ingres, painted the same year. In this version, Ingres wears several state decorations and ribbons, and he holds a top hat with a gloved hand. The face is more loosely painted than in the Uffizi portrait, and Ingres does not omit the cowlick that is apparent in the source photograph. The portrait is in the Fogg Art Museum, Cambridge, Massachusetts, US.

Ingres painted a near-replica of the Fogg painting in 1864–65 to fulfil a membership obligation to the Royal Museum of Fine Arts Antwerp, which owns the painting.

== See also ==
- List of paintings by Jean-Auguste-Dominique Ingres

== Sources ==
- Cohn, Marjorie B.; Siegfried, Susan L. (1980). Works by J.-A.-D. Ingres in the Collection of the Fogg Art Museum. Cambridge, Mass.: Fogg Art Museum, Harvard Univ. OCLC 6762670
- Finberg, A. J. Ingres. London, ISBN 978-1-5327-0047-7
- Rosenblum, Robert. Ingres. London: Harry N. Abrams, 1990. ISBN 978-0-300-08653-9
- Conisbee, Philip. Portraits by Ingres: Image of an Epoch. New York: Metropolitan Museum of Art, 1999. ISBN 978-0-300-08653-9
