= Portrait of Madame Marcotte de Sainte-Marie =

Painting by Jean-Auguste-Dominique Ingres

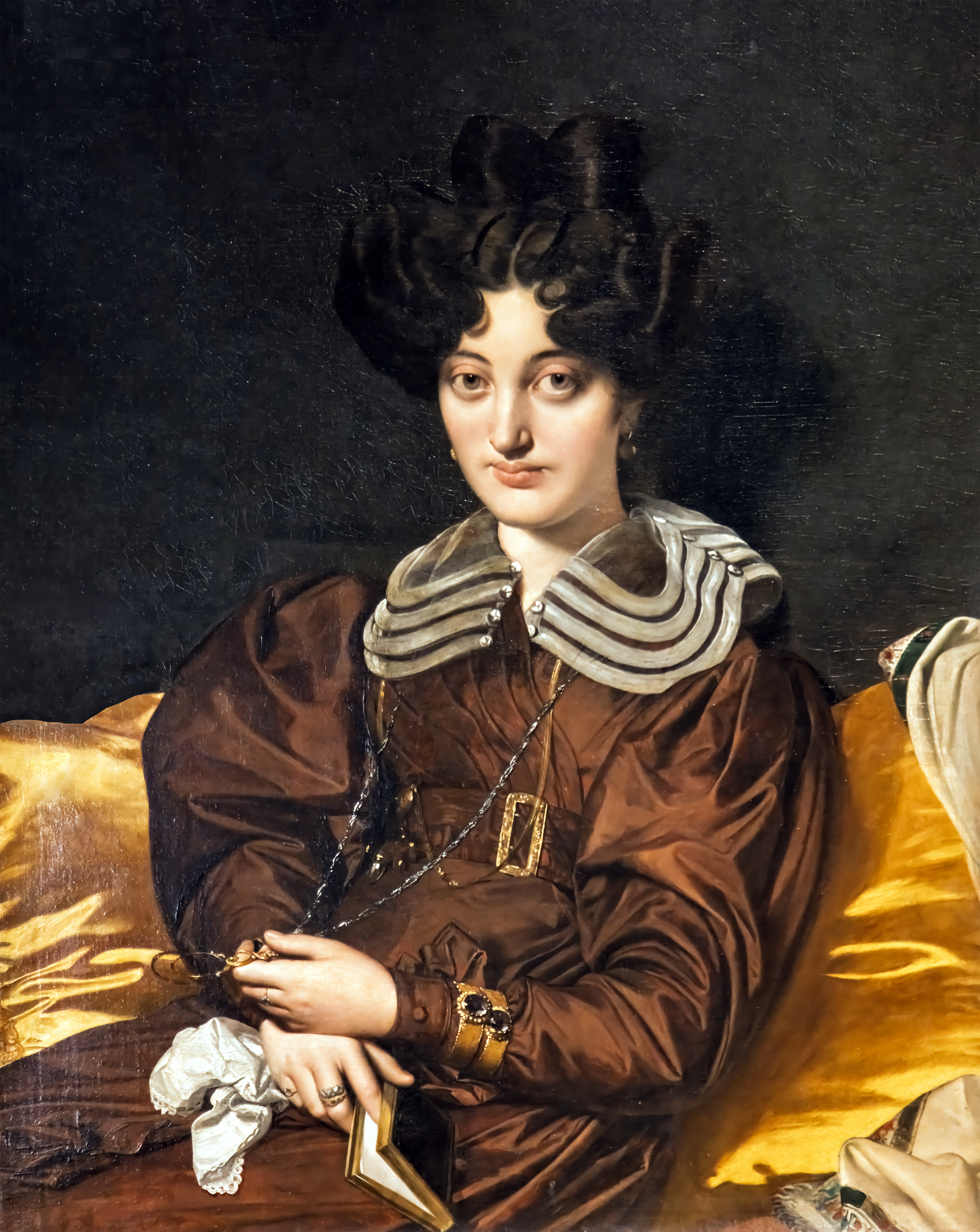
Portrait of Madame Marcotte de Sainte-Marie (1826) by Ingres

Portrait of Madame Marcotte de Sainte-Marie is an 1826 painting by Jean-Auguste-Dominique Ingres of Suzanne Clarisse de Salvaing de Boissieu, wife of Marin Marcotte de Sainte-Marie. The painting was exhibited at the Paris Salon of 1827. It is one of his earliest surviving portraits and one of the few portraits of women he produced in Paris straight after his return from Rome. Studies for it are now in the Louvre and a gallery in Montauban.

The painting initially belonged to its subject until her death. In 1862 it was left to her son Henri Marcotte de Sainte-Marie and in 1916 to his children. In 1923 it was acquired via David David-Weill by the Louvre, where it now hangs.

== See also ==
- List of paintings by Jean-Auguste-Dominique Ingres
