= Diana Bathing =

Diana Bathing may refer to:

- Diana Bathing with her Nymphs with Actaeon and Callisto, a 1634 painting by Rembrandt
- Diana Bathing (Boucher), a 1742 painting by François Boucher
