= Baldomero Pestana =

Spanish photographer and painter (1917–2015)

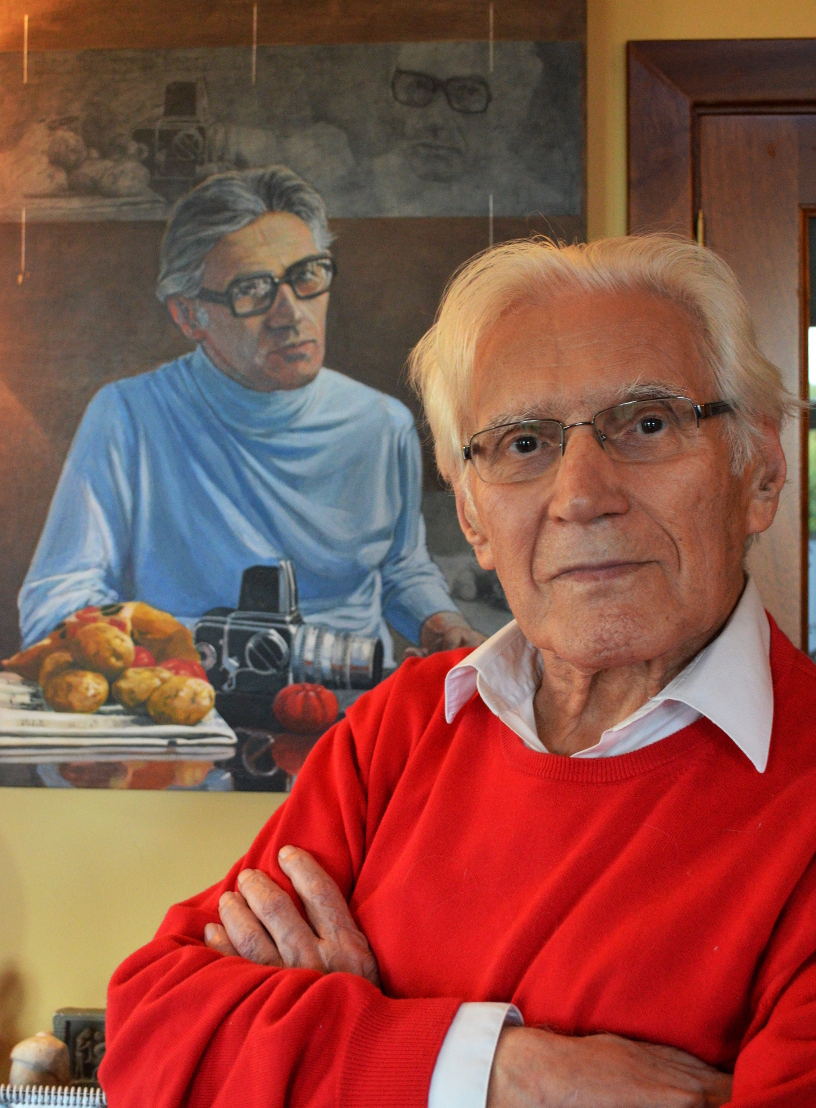
- Baldomero Pestana in 2012 in front of his portrait painted by his friend, the Peruvian painter Herman Braun-Vega in 1978.
- Born: December 28, 1917; Castroverde, Galicia, Spain
- Died: July 7, 2015 (aged 97); Bascuas, Province of Lugo, Galicia, Spain
- Occupations: Photographer, painter, figurative artist
- Known for: Photography, painting
- Spouse: Velia Martínez

Baldomero Pestana (Castroverde, December 28, 1917 – Bascuas, Province of Lugo in Galicia, July 7, 2015) was a Spanish photographer, painter, and figurative artist.

== Biography ==
He emigrated in his childhood to Argentina and began studying photography there as a teenager. He married Velia Martínez in 1951 and remained with her until her death in 2003.

In the 1950s, he started working as a photographer in Buenos Aires, where one of his first photo sessions was with Dizzy Gillespie at the Teatro Casino. In 1957, he moved to Peru where he worked as an advertising photographer for the weekly Caretas and the cultural magazine Fanal. There, he met numerous personalities of the great Latin American literary boom such as Mario Vargas Llosa, Jorge Luis Borges, and Sebastián Salazar Bondy. During his years in Peru, he published for magazines like Esquire, Time, and Life. He also took photos of the Villa Miseria for the United Nations.

In 1967, he moved to Europe and, after a brief stay in Madrid, finally settled in Paris where he continued photographing not only Latin American artists such as Gabriel García Márquez and Carlos Fuentes, but also artists like Man Ray, Roman Polanski, and Fernando Arrabal. By the mid-1970s, he began to abandon photography to focus on painting, working in a style close to hyperrealism.

In 2008, he returned to live in Galicia, where he had spent brief periods throughout his life. He dedicated himself to drawing and painting.

== Exhibitions and recognitions ==
Pestana regularly exhibited his painting and photography, both in America and Europe. He exhibited works in Peru, Argentina, France, Yugoslavia, Venezuela, South Korea, the United States, among others. Notable is his solo exhibition in Brussels at the Fred Lanzemberg gallery in 1979.

In Galicia, there were no exhibitions of his work until his return to Lugo. There was one in Vigo in 2010, featuring only painting and drawing, at the Garcia Barbon Theatre.

In 2012, he was declared an Honored Son of the town of Castroverde. The Museum of the Galician People organized an exhibition of photography and painting in 2013.

In 2015, the director from Vigo, Andrea Vázquez, created the documentary A imaxe reb/velada featuring Baldomero Pestana. It premiered at the Lima International Film Festival. That same year, the Museum of Contemporary Art of Lima organized an exhibition of his photographs. Also in 2015, the book "Retratos Peruanos" was published.

In 2018, the Gaiás Center Museum in the City of Culture of Galicia paid posthumous tribute to him with Baldomero Pestana: The truth in the hands, an exhibition focused on the photography of the artist from Lugo, which was also presented at the Instituto Cervantes in Paris along with the book of the same name.

In July 2022, the Central Reserve Bank of Peru issued a new 20-sol banknote featuring a portrait of José María Arguedas based on a photo taken by Baldomero Pestana.
