= Herman Braun-Vega =

Peruvian painter and artist (1933–2019)

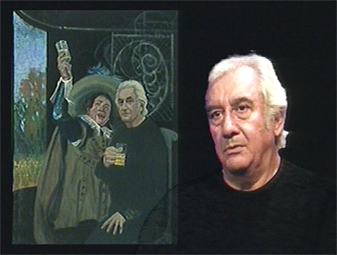
- Born: German Braun; 7 July 1933; Lima, Peru
- Died: 2 April 2019 (aged 85); Paris, France
- Known for: Painting
- Website: https://braunvega.com

Herman Braun-Vega (7 July 1933 in Lima – 2 April 2019 in Paris) was a Peruvian painter and artist.

Although his work has always been figurative, it was at first (before 1970) close to abstraction. It experienced a decisive turning point when the artist came to settle permanently in Paris in 1968. By being in contact with the works of the great masters of painting, Braun-Vega developed the art of pictorial quotation. He decided not to limit his painting to aesthetic research, but to adopt a clear pictorial language accessible to non-specialists even though his works often have several levels of reading. His painting, enriched with references to the history of art, often depicts characters, landscapes, fruits and vegetables from his native Peru. He asserts his mixed origins through syncretic work, often very colorful, interspersed with political messages including transfers of press clippings. The artist, who had set himself as a policy not to paint for saying nothing, defines himself as a witness of his time who wants to activate the memory of the spectator. His artistic production is in line with the trends of New figuration (Nouvelle figuration) and Narrative figuration (Figuration narrative).

== Biography ==
=== Family ===
His father, Francisco Braun Weisbrod, was Jewish born in 1902 under the Austro-Hungarian Empire, in the city of Stuhlweissenberg (Székesfehérvár), currently in Hungarian territory. Francisco (Franz in German) was the first member of the Braun family to emigrate to Peru. He was the older brother of Jacob Braun, who joined him in Peru in 1934 and whose story is recounted in the book The Journey of Jacob Braun: A New Orbit.

His mother, Armida Vega Noriega, was born in Iquitos, capital of the Peruvian Amazon.

Herman Braun-Vega was born in Lima. His older brother, Max (painter Fernando Vega), was born in February 1932. After Herman, three other siblings were born : Berti (architect and urban planner), Álex (designer) and Aurora (painter and draftsman).

His father bought art reproductions in Paris and had them framed in Peru. As a result, his brother Max was the first to want to become a painter. Herman wanted to do the same as his brother.

=== Education ===
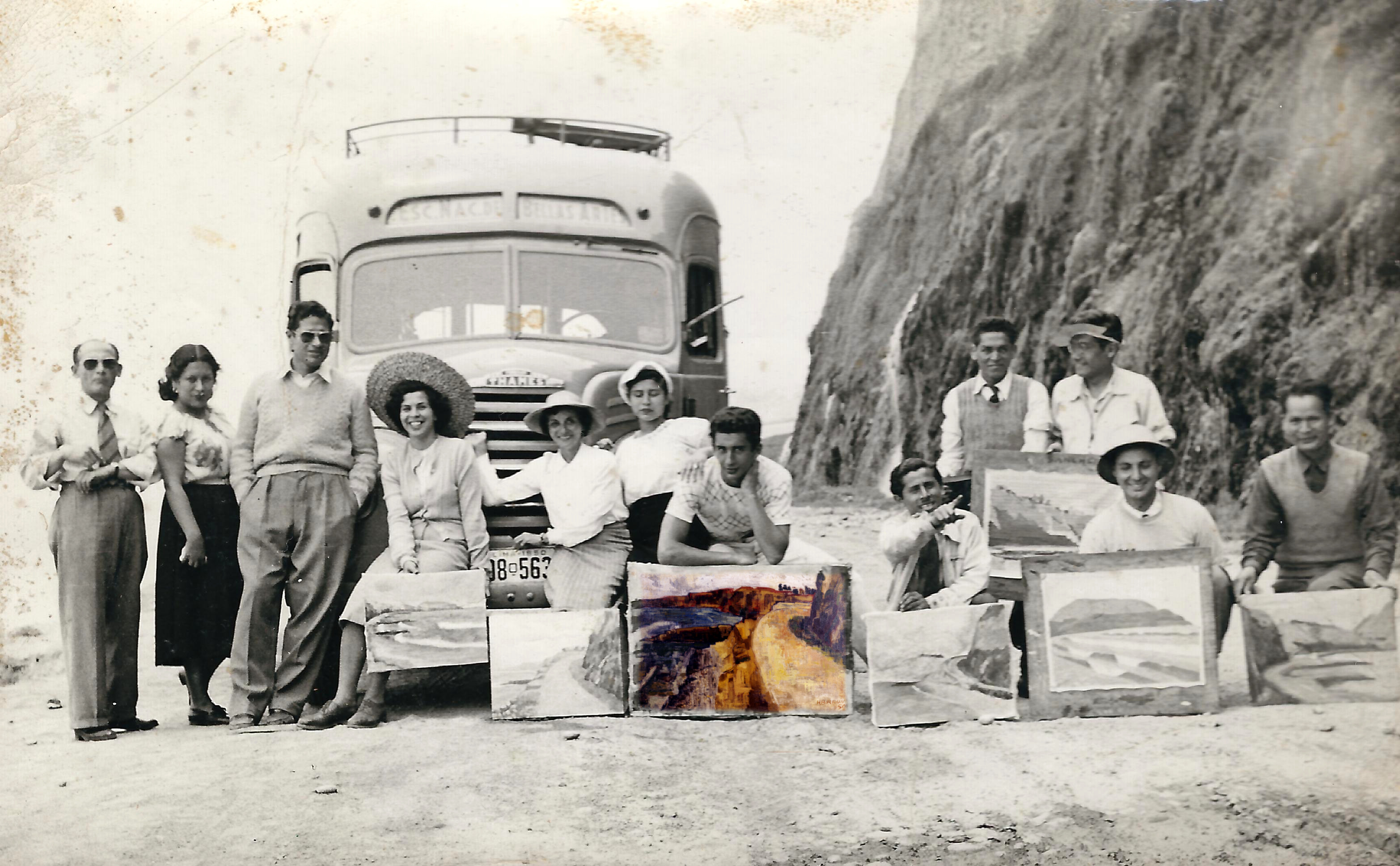
In 1950, in front of the bus of the National School of Fine Arts in Lima, among the students of his class, Herman Braun-Vega poses with his painting La bajada de Chorrillos.

In 1950, Herman became the student of Carlos Quizpez Asín at the School of Fine Arts in Lima, where he studied for a year and a half. At the beginning of 1951, his brother Max (19), who signed Fernando Vega, decided to travel to Paris to be a painter. At the end of that year (1951), Herman, only 18 years old, also moved to Paris to be a painter. Introduced by his brother to the poet Jean Sénac, he evolved as soon as he arrived in the Parisian artistic community in a privileged way as a resident of the Hôtel du Vieux-Colombier, then managed by Maria Manton and Louis Nallard. In Paris, he had for the first time the opportunity to see original works by great masters that he had only known until then through reproductions. From that moment he will continue his training as an autodidact, in contact with other artists, and by studying the works of the great masters of painting in museums.

=== Lima – Paris ===
In October 1952 his son Eric was born from a temporary affair with a young Frenchwoman, Camille Mülder, model of the photographer Albert Monier, who regularly frequented Saint-Germain-des-Prés. Herman had to abandon painting and dedicate himself to interior design, working for Jean Royère on whose behalf he finds himself in charge of opening a decoration agency in Peru. In 1955 he returned to Lima, where he opened an agency with architect Juan Gunther. But soon, despite the success of the business, the need to paint arises again. In Lima, he meets Nicole Boussel, a young mother of two blond children. The blended family he forms with his son, Nicole and her two boys will be a recurring source of inspiration in the years 63 to 66. In 1965, his brother Fernando (Max) died in Ibiza of an overdose of heroin.

=== A Peruvian in Paris ===
In November 1967, Herman returned to Paris with his son. There he met Lisbeth Schaudinn, a young German and granddaughter of zoologist Fritz Schaudinn, then working as a UNESCO official, who would become the woman of his life. With her, he visited the Picasso Museum in Barcelona in 1968. There he discovered, the series that the master dedicated to the meninas of Velázquez. This discovery marked a decisive turning point in his work. Lisbeth, his wife and model, provides Herman with logistical support that allows him to devote himself entirely to his art. Living in Paris, he did not forget Peru and made many round trips to Lima. The Peruvian press quickly echoes the success of the country's child with the Parisian critics. He exhibits in Paris, Lima, New York, Brussels... In the 1970s, from exhibitions to exhibitions, he developed new techniques and new themes that would enrich his future works. He travels a lot and his trips to Peru are so frequent that he gets a house built there. From the 1980s, his work resembles his life, shared between European culture and his Latin American origins.

=== Arcueil ===
In 1999, tired of making daily trips between his apartment on the rue des Apennins downtown Paris and his workshop in Saint-Denis, he decided to sell everything to buy in Arcueil, in the surburbs of Paris, not far from the workshops of his friends Vladimir Velickovic, Antonio Segui and François Arnal, an old factory that he transforms to install both his residence and his workshop. Despite the scale of the project, the architecture of which he designed himself, the pace of his artistic production did not slacken. But health problems began. In 2009, his wife Lisbeth died of illness. After this painful episode, he will eventually find a much younger companion, Violette Wojcik, an enthusiastic admirer, who finds herself suffering from leukemia only a few months after their meeting. He himself suffers from Parkinson’s disease and painfully completes his last paintings in 2014. He felt so much devastated by the loss of Violette in 2016 that his state of health did not allow him to attend the funeral. Despite everything, he shows determination and claims to have his next painting in mind, but he will never paint again until his death on April 2, 2019.

== Work ==
=== Early works (1949-1968), between Lima and Paris ===
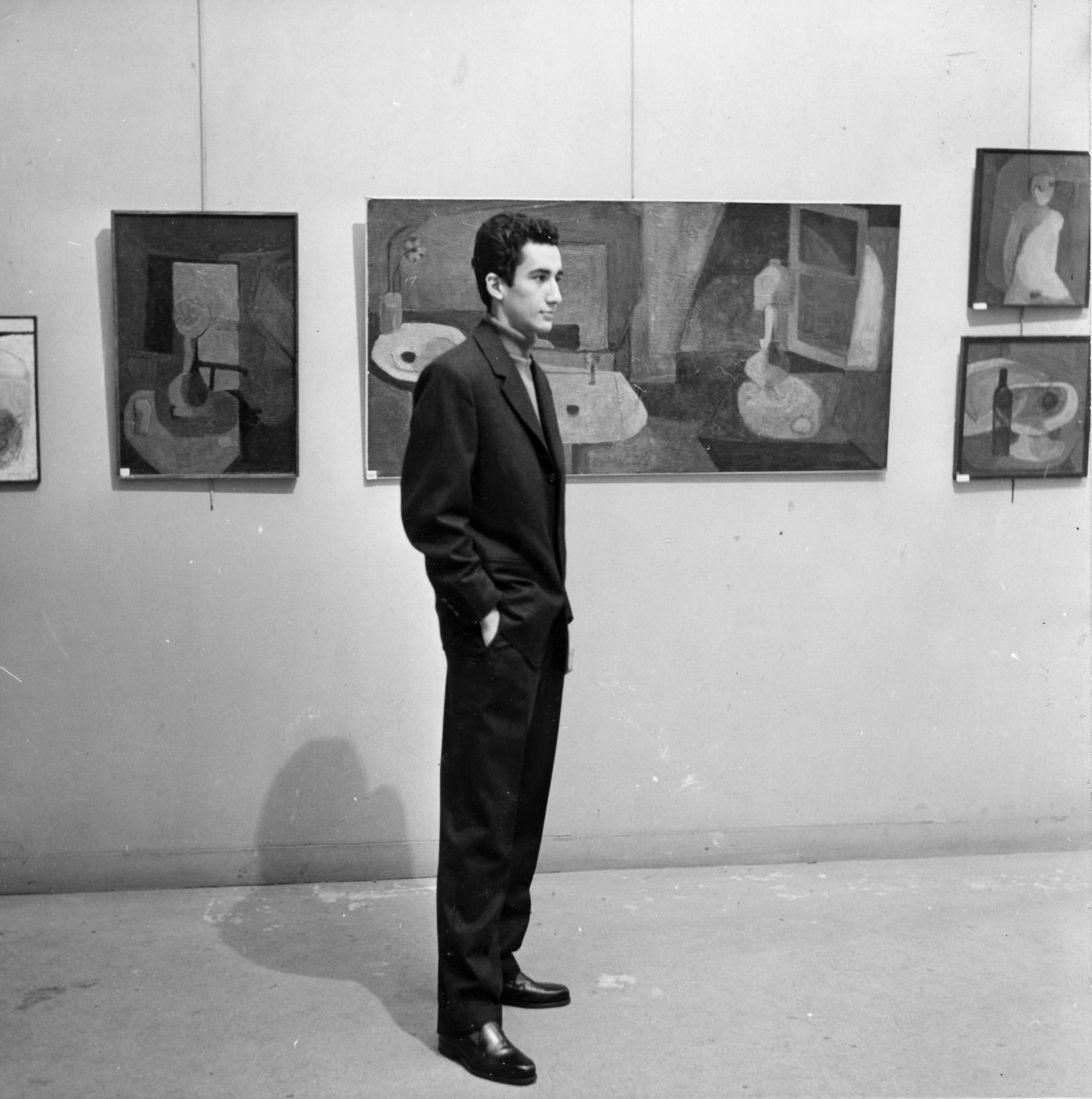
Herman Braun-Vega at the 1952 Salon d'Automne in Paris

==== Abstract figuration ====
Young Herman Braun produced paintings that integrated the lessons of modern art and fed on artistic movements like cubism (Still life with red wine bottle, 1949) or impressionism (Banana trees, 1951) that departed from photorealism. Traces of his first stay in Paris can be found in his early production (La Seine, 1952). Most of his work of this period was produced in Lima from 1963. He quickly adopted a very gestural and very free technique which contrasts sharply with the mastery, planning and rigor of execution of his later works (from 1973). The freedom of this technique allowed his figuration to border abstraction (Still life with candleholder, 1960; The birdcage 1963). But soon purely aesthetic considerations (Flying doves, 1963) were not enough to him, he also needed to express himself through his painting.

==== Talking paintings ====
Thus it happened to him to give a voice to some of his characters (Adam and Eve, 1965; Encuentro en el campo, 1965), or to cut out his painting in boxes in the style of a comic strip in order to insert narrative content (The artist ans his model, 1968) In 1966, he made of his brother Max, the painter Fernando Vega who suddenly died in Ibiza at the age of 33 from a heroin overdose, a heartbreaking portrait. His brother's face is framed, in large letters, by the words "MI HERMANO MAX" ("my brother Max" in Spanish). The irregularity of these letters and the brushstrokes that make up the portrait betray a movement of anger. At the place of the heart, a rip reveals the letters of the site where took place the tragedy: IBIZA. While this painting remains singular regarding the emotion it expresses, it is particularly representative of a fiery, vigorous painting, carried by emotion, guided by intuition. But it is also a painting that speaks, that testifies (in this case, to a personal drama). By making his painting speak, he also reveals a very personal humor. Thus in his version of the Annunciation (La anunciación, 1966), the angel Gabriel asks “Are you a virgin? » (“Eres virgen?” in Spanish) and Mary replies “Not yet” (“todavia no” in Spanish). The narrative effect obtained by cutting his painting into panels (La mort d'un pompier, 1969), he obtains it in the same way by producing a polyptych (Bodegón, 1967) where each panel painting corresponds to the panel of a comic strip. Thus, in May 1968, he produced a triptych (Liberty? Equality? Fraternity?) which for the first time in his work testifies to a current event of his time.

=== The appropriation of the great masters of painting (1968–1978) ===
In June 1992, in an interview with Eduardo Arroyo and Jorge Semprun, Braun-Vega declared "Picasso is my father, he made me as I am. Velasquez is my master, he trained me as a painter.” He indeed owes to Picasso the great metamorphosis that begins in his work from 1968 and ends in the early 1980s. He explains it as follows: “Making mine the work of others is the great lesson Picasso gave me.” It is indeed by discovering the Meninas series by Picasso at the Picasso Museum in Barcelona in 1968 that he realized that one should not be afraid to appropriate the work of others.

==== The Velázquez series (1968) ====
Velázquez's Las Meninas is the subject of Herman Braun's series Velazquez laid bare accompanied by the Meninas.

So that as soon as he returned to Paris, launching himself a challenge, he produced, in two and a half months like Picasso (but without imitating him), a series of fifty-three paintings entitled Velazquez laid bare accompanied by the Meninas. It is a cinematic study ("a kind of cartoon") with bright side lights and contrasted colors, of the moments which supposedly preceded the placement of the characters in the pose of Velázquez's famous painting. Herman Braun uses the polyptych technique experimented with in the previous years to achieve the desired narrative effect. He exhibited in Paris at gallery 9. The Parisian critics were won over. Claude Bouyeure, for La Galerie des Arts, judges the “style exercise” “Successful”. Suzanne TENAND, for La Tribune des Nations, sees “paintings full of spirit, enthusiasm and talent”. Paule GAUTHIER, for Les Lettres françaises, remains “confounded by the accuracy of Braun’s system”. Jean-Jacques Lévêque, in Les Nouvelles littéraires, sees it as proof “that a great future is still possible for the ‘painted surface’” and hails, in Le Nouveau Journal, “an astonishing virtuosity in the perspective of layout and animation specific to narrative figuration”. Carol Cutler, Herald Tribune, notes “A stunning performance”. Frédéric Megret, Le Figaro Littéraire, finds the painter “captivating”. Monique Dittière, L'Aurore, salutes «a great audacity» and a «won» bet. Philippe Caloni, Combat, summarizes «On the substance, great intelligence. On the form, perfect mastery». The main multiptych of the series, composed of 17 panels, is on display at the Museum of Antioquia, in Medellín, Colombia, in the Coltejer collection. Other paintings of this series, Velázquez Stripped Bare Accompanied by the Ladies-in-Waiting in Fifty-Three Parts, No. 3 and Velásquez Going to His Easel, are part of the latin american collection of the Blanton Museum of Art at the University of Texas at Austin.

==== Picasso and Manet (1969–1970) ====
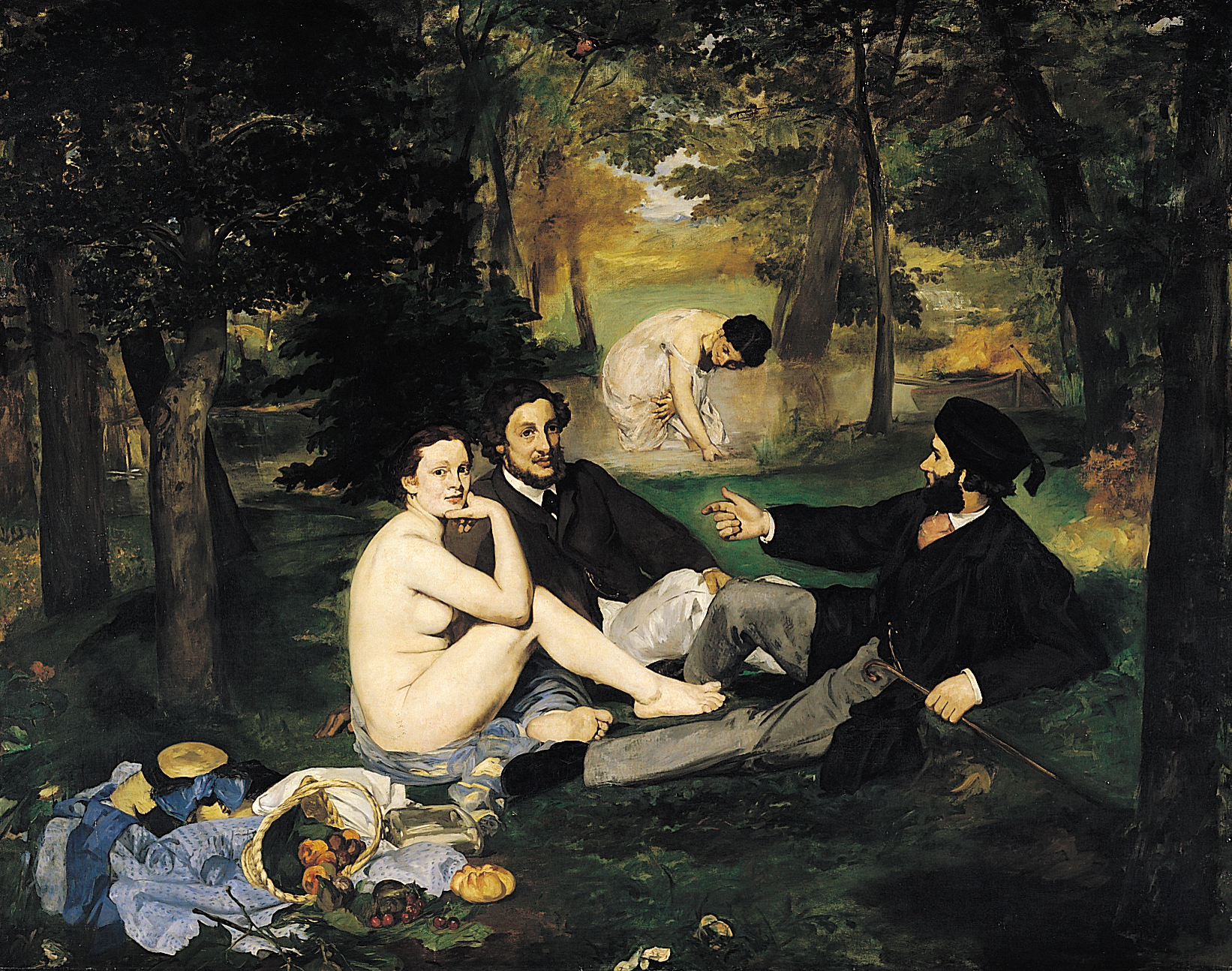
Le Déjeuner sur l'herbe by Manet is the set in which Picasso bursts into the series Picasso dans un déjeuner sur l'herbe.

After being inspired by Picasso to study Velázquez, it is now Picasso himself that he studies and his relationship to Manet, with a new exhibition at gallery 9, entitled For the Love of Art in which can be seen, in a humorous series entitled Picasso in a luncheon on the grass, Picasso expressing his love for women by taking the place of one of the characters in Manet's Luncheon on the grass. Which leads John Canaday to describe this series as “seriously hilarious”. However, it reveals «neither irony nor aggressiveness» but rather «a desire to show the evolutionary process of art». This series earned him the title of «virtuoso with a taste for pastiche» in the International Herald Tribune. Braun engaged for the first time in the practice of pictorial quotation by reproducing certain elements of Picasso's paintings in his own works such as the mirror of The Young Girl in Front of a Mirror in his painting Picasso in the Bathtub, or even an entire painting like The enameled saucepan in his diptych Picasso in Mougin. The critics appreciate it. Xaviere Gaetan, for La Galerie des Arts, finds “remarkable [...] the tribute, full of love, paid to Picasso”. As for Monique Dittière, L'aurore, with regard to this exhibition sees in Braun «A young leader of the Nouvelle Figuration». The painting Guests on the Grass, a sort of synthesis between his series Vélasquez laid bare accompanied by the meninas and the series Picasso in a lunch on the grass, joined the collection of the Museum of Modern Art of the City of Paris at the end of 1970.

==== Cézanne (1970) ====
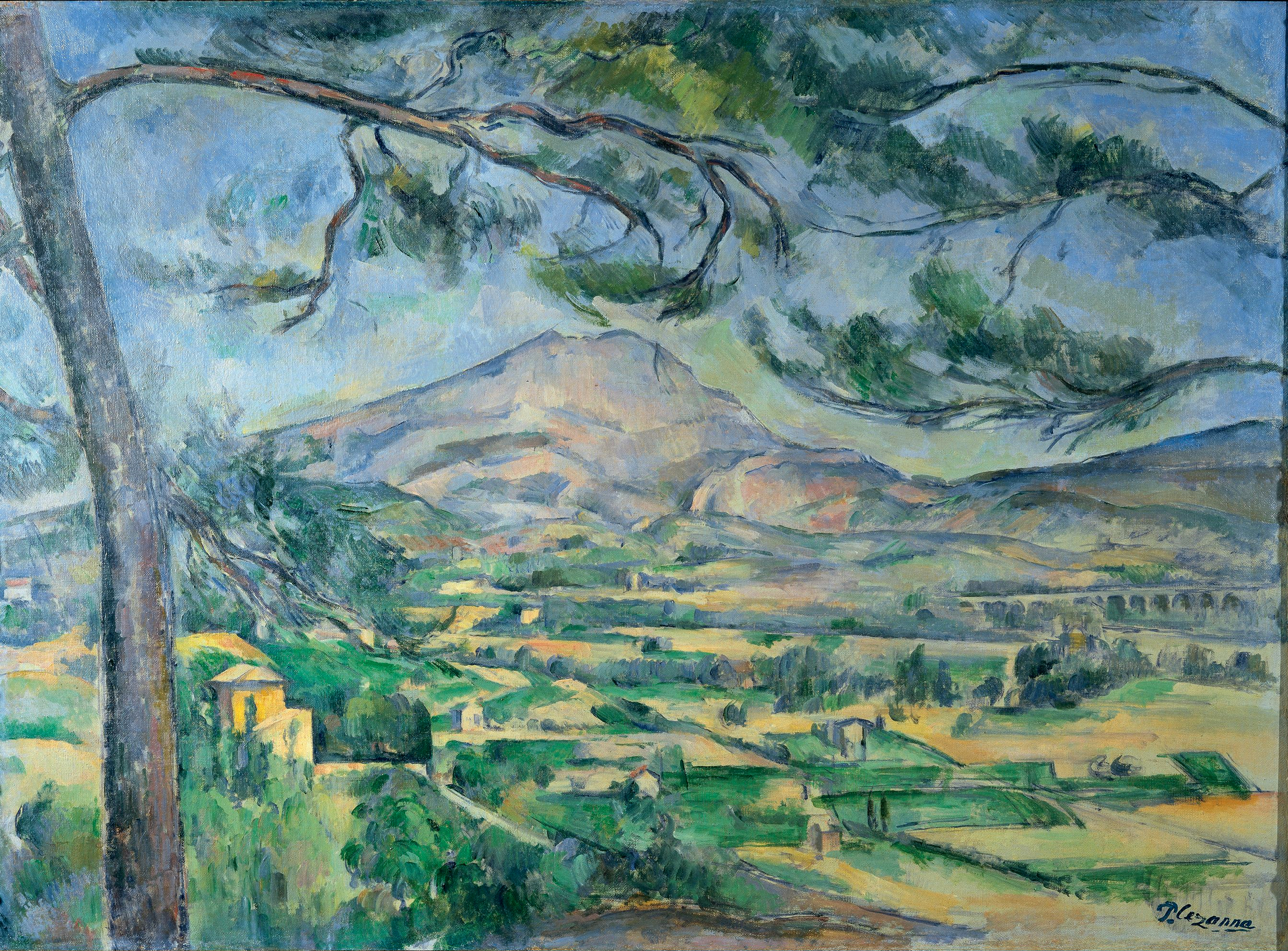
Mont Sainte-Victoire with Large Pine by Cézanne has been the subject of several variations in the triptic Une affaire de pommes n°2 (Cézanne)

His study of Cézanne results in a large triptych, which again can be read as a comic strip. In this triptych, Braun draws a connection between the apple of Adam and Eve and the apples of Cézanne’s still lifes, placing the latter in a role of «Father Creator», making a parallel between creation in the biblical sense and artistic creation. Each panel of the triptych represents the same interior at different stages of the narrative. Hanging on the wall is reproduced a still life with apples by Cézanne. The window reveals a landscape of the Sainte-Victoire mountain, another work by Cézanne. These two works will undergo transformations from one panel to another, thus reinforcing the narrative effect of the whole. Braun had already put a painting within a painting in his diptych Picasso in Mougin. What is new here is the use of a window to reveal a landscape, another way of inserting a painting within the painting. This is something that he will use a lot when he becomes Braun-Vega and which is undoubtedly related to the choice of the title Windows of art, soul and life by curator Christian Noorbeergen for the last exhibition organized during the artist's lifetime at the UNESCO Headquarters in Paris in 2018.

==== Ingres (1971–1972) ====
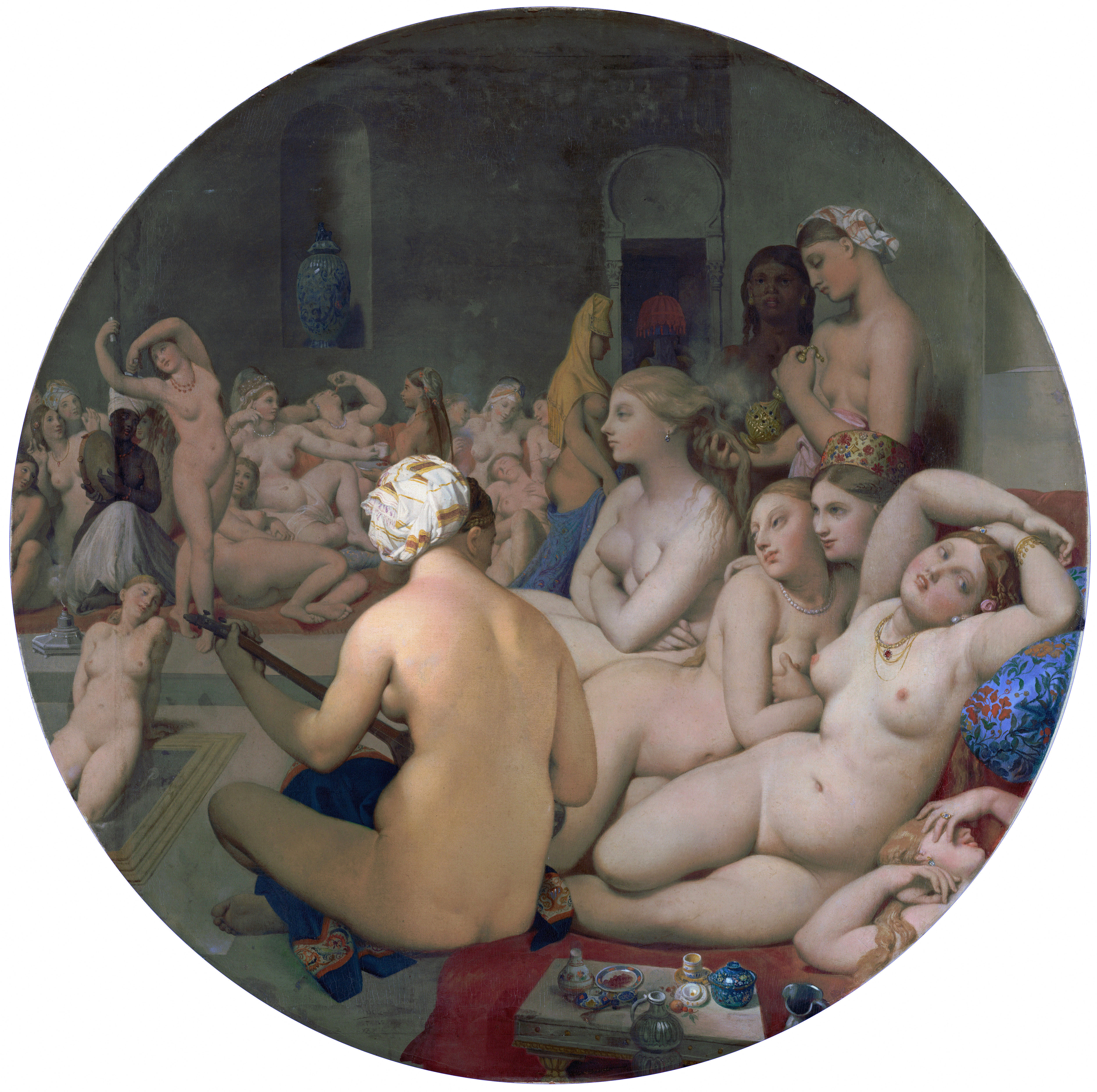
The Turkish Bath by Ingres was the subject of study for Herman Braun in his series The Turkish Bath in New York.

In his series on The Turkish Bath, Braun analyses the plastic and aesthetic influences of Ingres' work in certain trends of contemporary art (geometric abstraction, hyper-realism). This series, intended to be exhibited at the Lerner-Heller Gallery in New York, is entitled The Turkish Bath in New York. This is the first time he makes in one of his paintings (Ingres and his models in Manhattan) a nod to the city that hosts his exhibition, but not the last... There are also many first times in this series, which perhaps explains this comment from Picture on exhibit which salutes the "tour de force" represented by these variations around the Turkish bath ranging from the simple drawing to the use of the most diverse techniques. Indeed among the techniques experimented by Braun in this series, we find the polychrome wooden frames that are an integral part of the work, overflowing on it and contributing to its staging, a technique that he reused abundantly in the 90s, but also trompe l'oeil effects that he will develop in particular in his next series about Poussin. Note in particular the appearance, as a counterpoint, of contemporary daily political and social life, through the integration of press cuttings. The Peruvian daily El Comercio, which echoes the good reviews of the New York specialized press, reports in particular that William D. Case believes that, unlike a large number of South American artists who suffer from negligence and caricature, Braun overcomes both "by balancing spontaneous execution with a great deal of planning and developing caricature to a degree comparable with that of Picasso or Bacon".

==== Poussin (1973–1974) ====
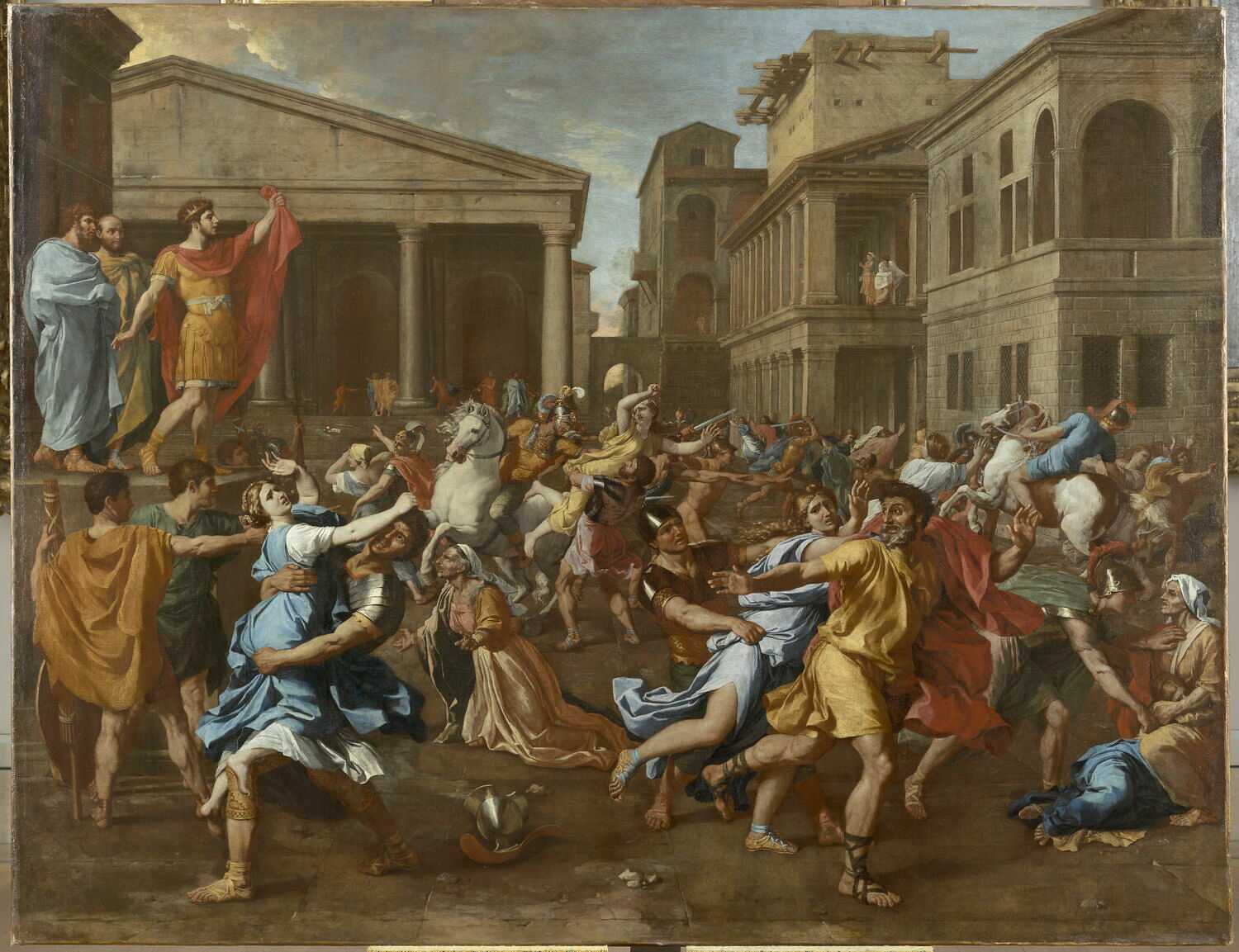
Nicolas Poussin's The Rape of the Sabine Women is intertwined with the 1973 Chilean coup d'état in Herman Braun's series, which bears the same name.

Since the dynamic begun in 1968 after the discovery of Picasso's Las Meninas, Braun has never stopped, while studying the great masters of painting, from experimenting with new techniques which each time increase his skills. He is now presented as the painter who made painting the subject of his painting. However, he explains his deep motivation in the workshop interview with Jorge Semprun and Eduardo Arroyo: « Around the sixties seven, sixty eight, I went through a crisis, I questioned myself about why I painted the way I painted then, it was a confidential painting, for specialists. The general public did not have access to it [...]. This is where the need I felt for formal and conceptual clarity came from [...]. I submitted myself to the most orthodox possible discipline of visual language. » and with the series of paintings entitled The Abduction of the Sabines after Poussin, a technical and iconographic study of the painting The Rape of the Sabine Women from the Louvre Museum, the acquisition of this clarity of pictorial language sought by Braun becomes perfectly evident. In this series whose cold and effective "à la Poussin" style is bathed in a warm chromatic, Braun takes an ironic look at our «culture of consumption» by inserting in trompe l'oeil everyday consumer objects. But above all, by inserting press clippings as clues to decipher its composition, he mixes the violence of the aggression of civilians by soldiers represented by Poussin’s painting, with the violence of events of his time such as the military coup against Allende in Chile, or the attack on the drugstore of Saint-Germain in Paris. In other paintings, he also witnesses the political, economic and social situation in France. Marie-Claude Volfin, for Les Nouvelles Littéraires, points out that «Unlike Equipo Cronica, who seeks to demystify the notion of a masterpiece, there is no parody in Herman Braun’s excellent work but a transfer of values». Indeed, Monique Dittière, for L'Aurore, points out that for Braun the study of the ancients, once again, is only a pretext to «demonstrate first the continuity in the art». From this series, the painting Poussin au quarter de porc joined the collection of the National Contemporary Art Fund. Five other paintings in this series (Reconstitution of the attack, From this day dates a new era, Witness to an attack, Chilean-style kidnapping II and Everything is recoverable) were part of Daniel Cordier's collection.

==== Rembrandt, Vermeer, Hals (1975–1977) ====
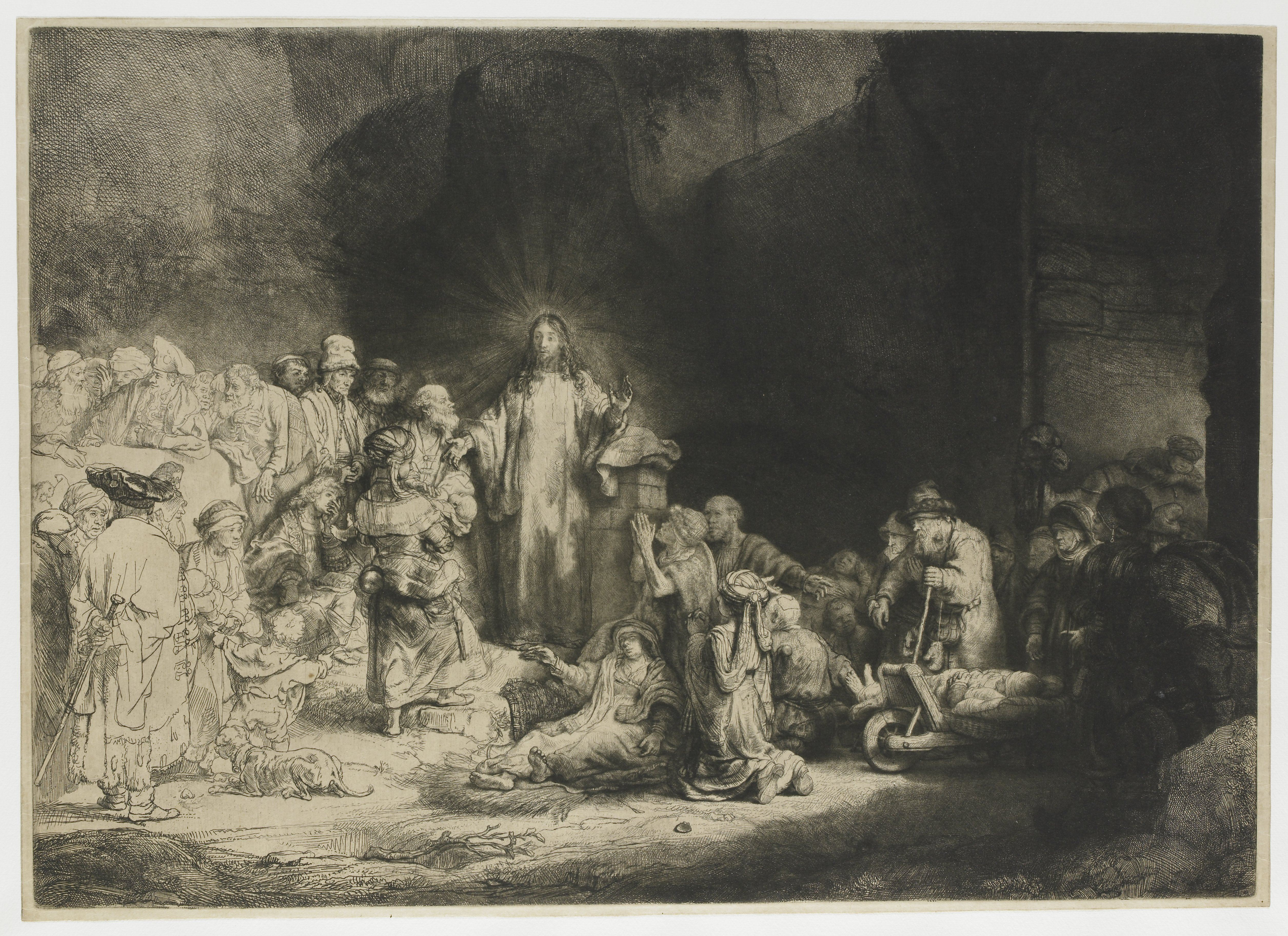
Through the Hundred Guilder Print by Rembrandt, Herman Braun addresses the problem of counterfeiting in his album of prints Aggression, mutilation and forgery.

Continuing his exploration of the great masters of painting, Braun studied the graphic work of Rembrandt at the Louvre and the Rijksmuseum. In Amsterdam he also studied Vermeer and Hals. While since 1966 he has chosen to paint with acrylic which better suits his pace of work rather than oil which he very quickly abandoned, this time he focuses his work on completely different techniques. The production of prints is not new to him, but of the 2 series he produced on this occasion, the first, an Album of seven prints (mixed technique copper engraving and screen printing) whose title Agressions... Mutilations... et faux (Rembraun) is motivated by a reflection on the falsifications which affect the diffusion of engraving, is produced in collaboration with Rigmor Poenaru, Henri Patez, Baldomero Pestana and Alain Jouffroy who wrote the introductory text. The second is a series of mixed media paintings (watercolor, pencil, collage and spray on plexiglas) entitled The portrait of things. Whereas this technique will not be reused in his future works, still lifes, on the other hand, will play an important role in what will become his recurring theme «cultural syncretism». With his print album, Braun confirms a strong political bias which arouses the interest of Rouge, daily newspaper of the Revolutionary Communist League. There he drew for the first time a comparison between The anatomy lesson by Rembrandt and the photo of the dead Che, which he would use again a few years later in his Anatomy lesson... in the countryside. Braun confirms what had already appeared clearly in his Poussin series: for him, pastiche is also a way to criticize reality. The National Museum of Visual Arts (Uruguay) has a complete copy of the album of seven prints.

=== Collaborative portraits (1978–1980) ===
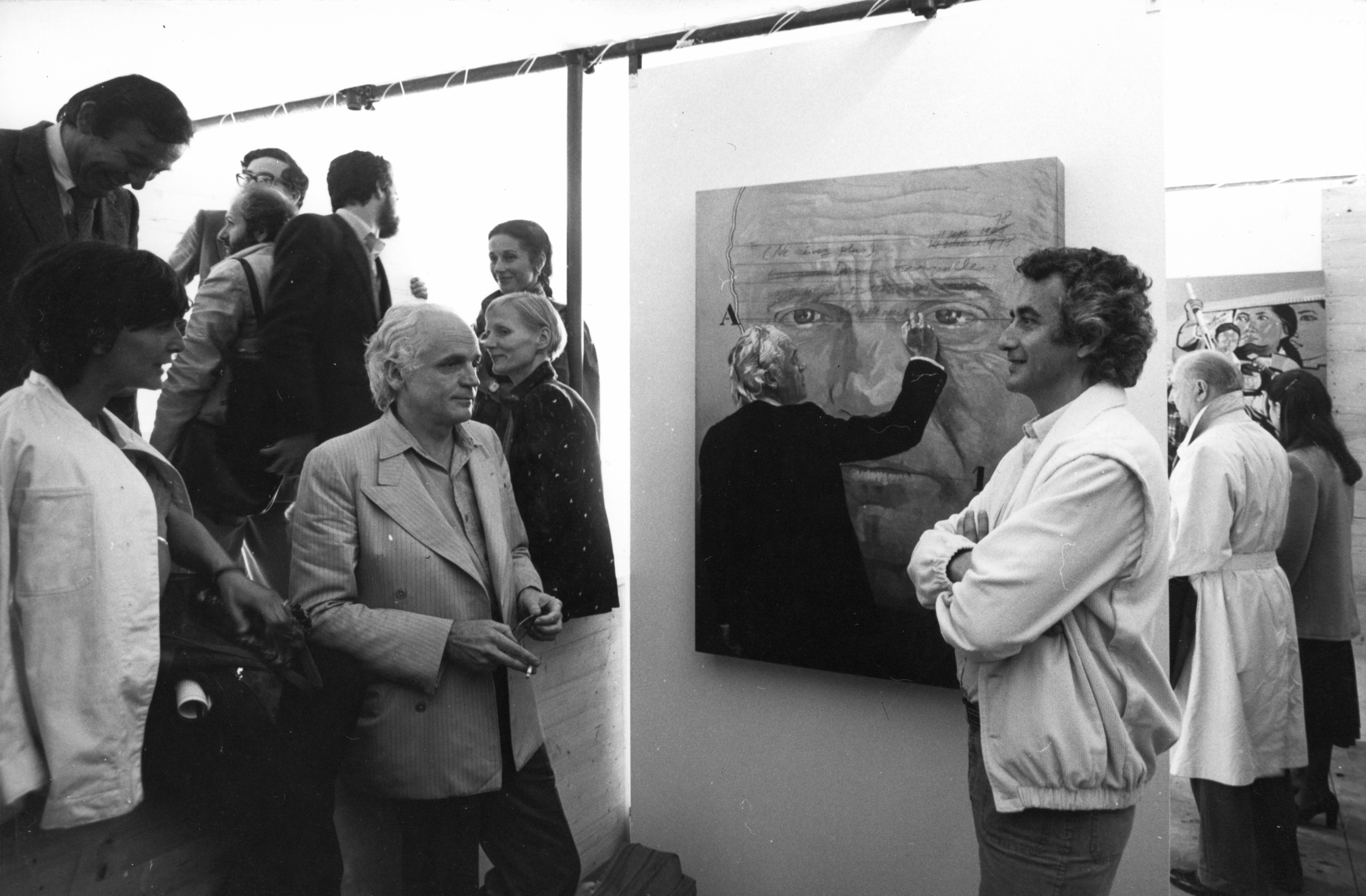
Alain Jouffroy and Herman Braun-Vega in front of the portrait of the former created by the latter at the 39th Venice Biennale, 1980.

From 1978, Herman Braun-Vega began to paint portraits, notably those of his painter friends whom he invited to participate in the gestation of the paintings: Vladimir Veličković and Baldomero Pestana in 1978, Wifredo Lam (collection of the National Fund of Contemporary Art), Gilles Aillaud and Eduardo Arroyo in 1979, Erró in 1978–1982, Jean Dewasne in 1982, Stanley William Hayter in 1983, Gérard Fromanger in 1984. He also paints several writers: Alain Jouffroy, Jorge Semprún, Julio Ramón Ribeyro, Alfredo Bryce Echenique, Jean-Michel Ribes. It was at this time that he became aware of the interest of photography for his work after inflicting long posing sessions on his friend Julio Ramón Ribeyro. He had already produced portraits of the photographer José Casals and the writer Pablo Neruda in 1965, but these were very stylized portraits. This time, pursuing his objective of clarity of pictorial language, Braun creates «lifelike» portraits, between realism and hyper-realism. However beyond the «virtuosity of the painter», Maïten Bouisset, in Le Matin de Paris, Stresses that the interest of these portraits lies in the collaboration between the painter and the model so that these portraits are not limited to the restitution of the physical aspect of the model but also reveals his psychology, his environment, his tastes, his history, his activities, etc... Thus, Arroyo composed with personal objects the still life which is on the table in front of him, while Fromanger painted directly on his portrait the colorful confetti which escape from the newspaper. As early as 1979, his portrait of Veličković was noticed by the art critic Jean-Marie Dunoyer on the show Grands et jeunes d'aujourd'hui at the Grand Palais. For 2 years Braun devoted himself almost exclusively to portraits, then continued to do so occasionally until 2014 with the portrait of Gilles Ghez. In 1980, he represented Peru at the 39th Venice Biennale with ten of his portraits.

=== Memories, Cultural Syncretism and Interpicturality (1981–2014) ===
==== Crossbreeding and syncretism ====
Whereas we can see a form of syncretism in his portraits because they result from exchanges with his contemporaries, it is in the 1981 exhibition in Lima that the recurring theme of crossbreeding and cultural syncretism is definitively and ostensibly anchored in his work. The works presented in this exhibition testify to the outcome of the painter’s metamorphosis («I worked 12 years to prepare this exhibition» he confides to La Prensa). It contains almost all the elements so characteristic of his future work:

- Clarity of pictorial language
- Systematic appropriation of the works of other artists (“That a painter uses works of other painters as themes in his paintings is not a novelty. The novelty is [...] to make it [...] a system.” Julio Ramón Ribeyro)
- Encounter with the contemporary political, social, economic, cultural or daily reality.
- Inclusion of press clippings that beyond the aesthetic effect, gives indications on the story that the painter tells through the painting.

The appropriation of the work of a great master no longer has the aim of commenting on the work ("We could speak [...] of metapainting, [...] but this definition is reductive if we take into account the evolution of his work." Julio Ramón Ribeyro) as it was the case with the series Velázquez laid bare, but to serve another message as it can be done in literature with a quote. We can now speak of pictorial quotes. These last ones are faced with contemporary characters, landscapes and objects, most often Latin American ones, thus creating a contrast of time and place. These encounters work either by analogy as in Bonjour Monsieur Poussin where the presence of a tank in the streets of a city and The Rape of the Sabine Women by Poussin both represent military aggression against civilians, or by opposition as in Buenos dias Vermeer where the hushed universe of the Young woman with a water pitcher by Vermeer comes face to face with the atmosphere of a South American shanty town.

==== The North-South theme ====
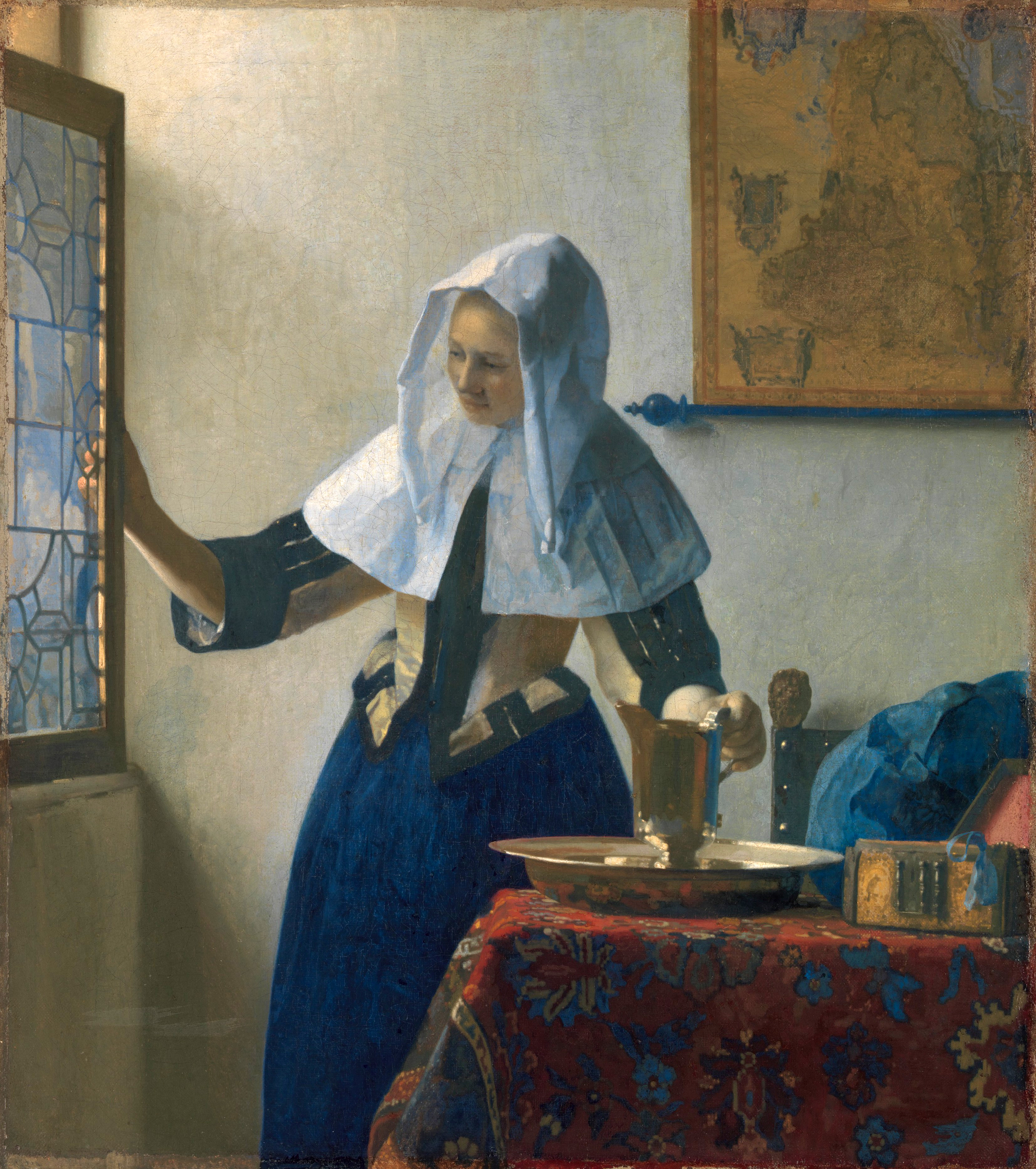
Vermeer’s Woman with a Water Jug becomes the representative of the North in the painting Buenos dias Vermeer, an allegory of North-South relations.

From 1981 onwards, the North and South cardinal points appear in some of his works, sometimes discreetly, as on the paper held in the hand of Pope Innocent X by Velasquez in the painting I love the neutron bomb, or as in the painting Buenos dias Vermeer, in the form of graffiti on the edge of the wall separating the universe of Vermeer from the Latin American world, sometimes in a much more obvious way with red letters as on the North-South drawing from the FRAC Normandie Caen collection, or as on the drawings Le bain... after Ingres I and Le bain... after Ingres II. In these last three drawings, the North-South axis symbolically separates the characters of Ingres, personifying the North, and enjoying the pleasures of the bath, from the contemporary South American characters who meanwhile are busy with household chores. Thus these drawings are allegories of the North-South relationship where the countries of the North benefit from the hard work of the countries of the South. This use of the encounter of characters taken from Western painting and characters from the painter's daily reality to symbolize North-South relations becomes recurrent. This is a possible key to reading some of his works, even if the latter do not explicitly show the North and South cardinal points, as it is the case with the painting The Cheaters (after de La Tour), in which the servant in the painting The Card Sharp with the Ace of Diamonds by Georges de La Tour is replaced by a Peruvian peasant woman symbolizing the servitude of Third World countries to the rich countries, the cheaters around the table. In this way, the painter provides an ironic and critical testimony to his time.

==== Testimonial Art ====
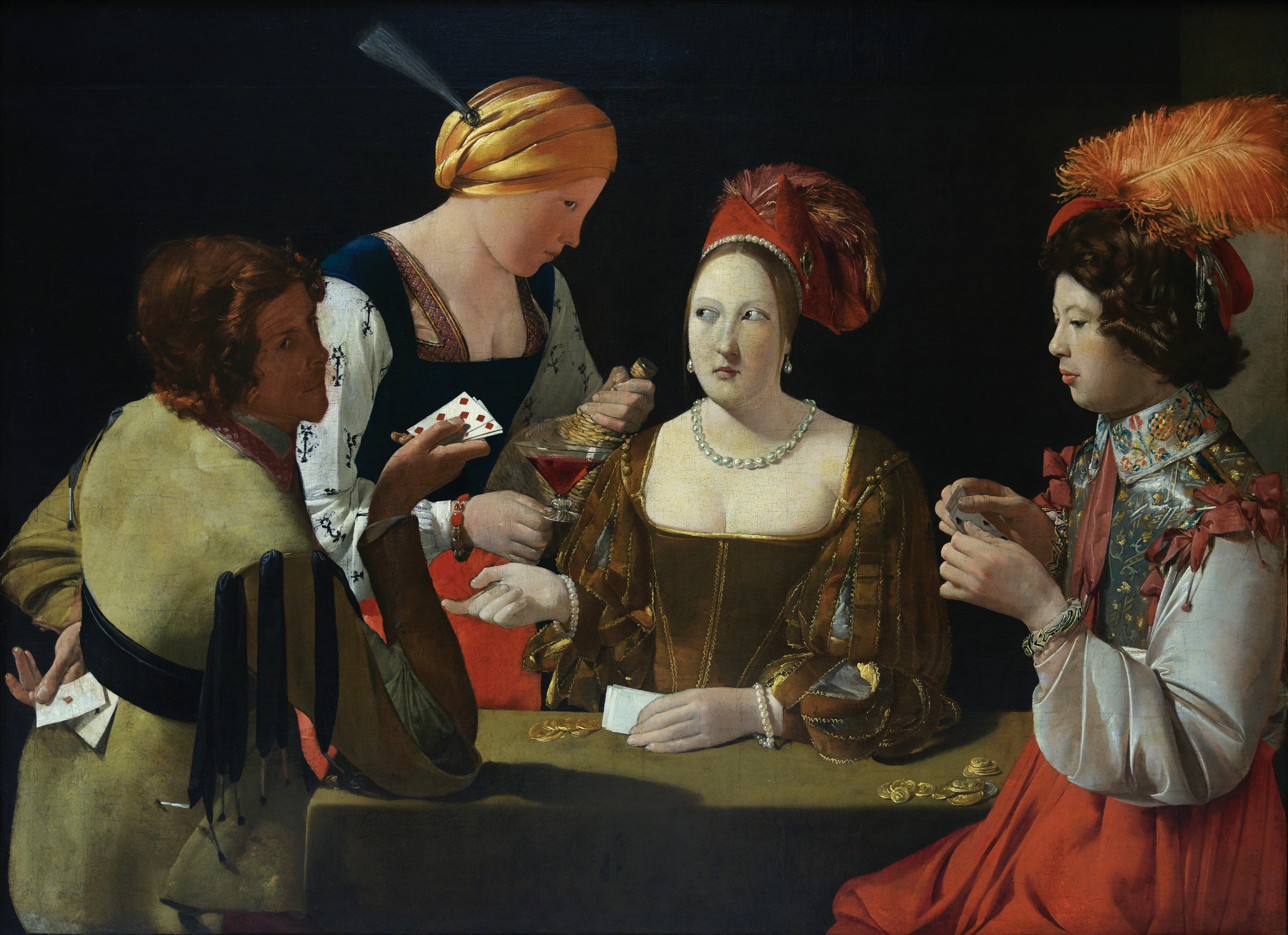
Georges de La Tour's The Card Sharp with the Ace of Diamonds can be found in several of Braun-Vega's drawings, paintings and prints, including one made with writer Julio Ramón Ribeyro.

Braun through his art claims to be an active witness of his time regardless of the technique used. And for him, the exploration of a new technique must be the opportunity to produce a new plastic effect. In 1982, very temporarily putting aside his art of pictorial quotation to concentrate exclusively on the testimonial dimension of his work, he explored a new technique by which he produced a series of reliefs on paper entitled testimonio. In this series the word testimony takes on a double meaning. On one hand, the imprint left on the paper by the clothing of civilians under the effect of the press testifies to the existence of the object. On the other hand, the added graphics evoking the survey of a crime scene are intended to bear witness to the violence committed against civilians throughout the world. This series was exhibited at the Forum gallery in Lima accompanied by drawings and prints in an exhibition exclusively devoted to his works on paper. Two prints particularly attracted the attention of critics. Those he produced in close collaboration with his great friend the writer Julio Ramón Ribeyro. A witness to its time, Braun-Vega's art also aims to be a witness to historical memory with the creation in 1983, on the occasion of the bicentenary of Bolivar's birth, of a diptych entitled Bolivar, luz y penumbras . In 1984, on the occasion of the 1st Havana Biennial, he donated this diptych to his friend Arnold Belkin for the Museo Universitario del Chopo of which he was director.

==== Braun becomes Braun-Vega ====
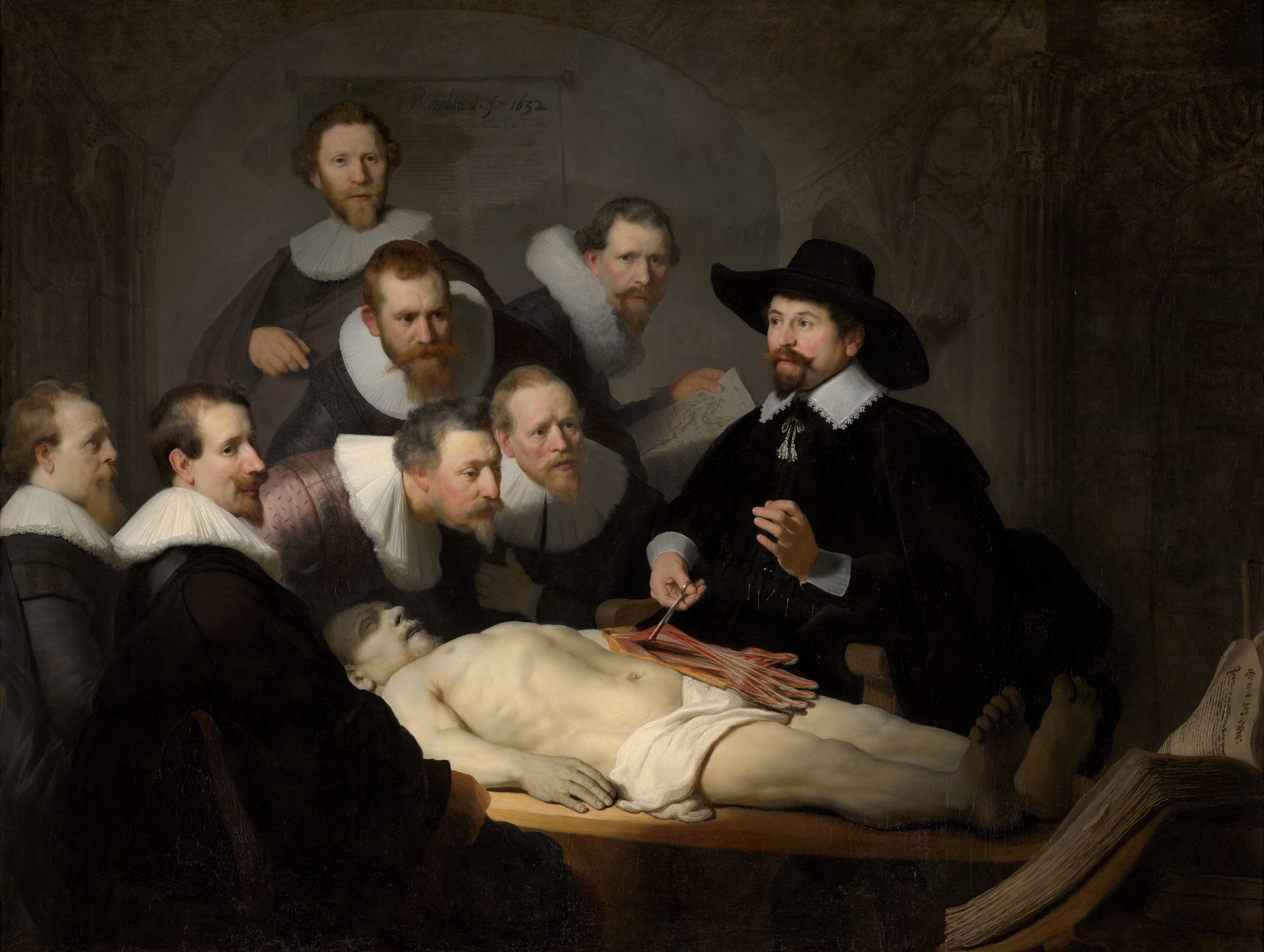
Rembrandt's The Anatomy Lesson of Dr. Nicolaes Tulp is the subject of numerous diversions in Braun-Vega's work, as in The Lesson... in the Country (1984).

The artistic production of Herman Braun, whose roots are now firmly defined, now develops on large format canvases (2m × 3m) for an exhibition entitled Paysages Mémoire at the Théâtre du Rond-Point in Paris in 1984.

From now on, as if to mark his metamorphosis, he no longer signs HB or Herman Braun, but Herman Braun-Vega. At the name of his Austro-Hungarian father, he adds the name of his Peruvian mother in the Spanish way as if to affirm his mixed origins. The theme of crossbreeding and syncretism thus directly associated with the artist himself will remain omnipresent throughout the rest of his work.

Sensitive to Braun-Vega's ability to freely recreate the spirit of the artists with whom he nourishes his painting, critic Jean-Luc Chalumeau, who appreciates his "flamboyant unrealism", underlines the skill with which he plays with the grain of the unbleached canvas as if it was a color on its own right on his palette. This is another recurring technical feature in his painting, allowing the raw material of the medium to appear in places, also when he paints on wooden panels.

The eight large format paintings of the “Paysages Mémoire” series that he exhibited in 1985 at the 18th Sao Paulo Biennial made him “the star of the biennial” according to the curator of the exhibition. Among these, we can mention Why not them ?, an irreverent plea for the popularization of culture, where the Grande Odalisque by Ingres is offered to the curiosity of children (collection of the museum of the city of Maubeuge) and The lesson.. . in the countryside, inspired by the analogy between the anatomy lesson by Rembrandt and the photo of Che's remains (collection of the Latin America Memorial in São Paulo).

==== The nude, revealing diversity ====
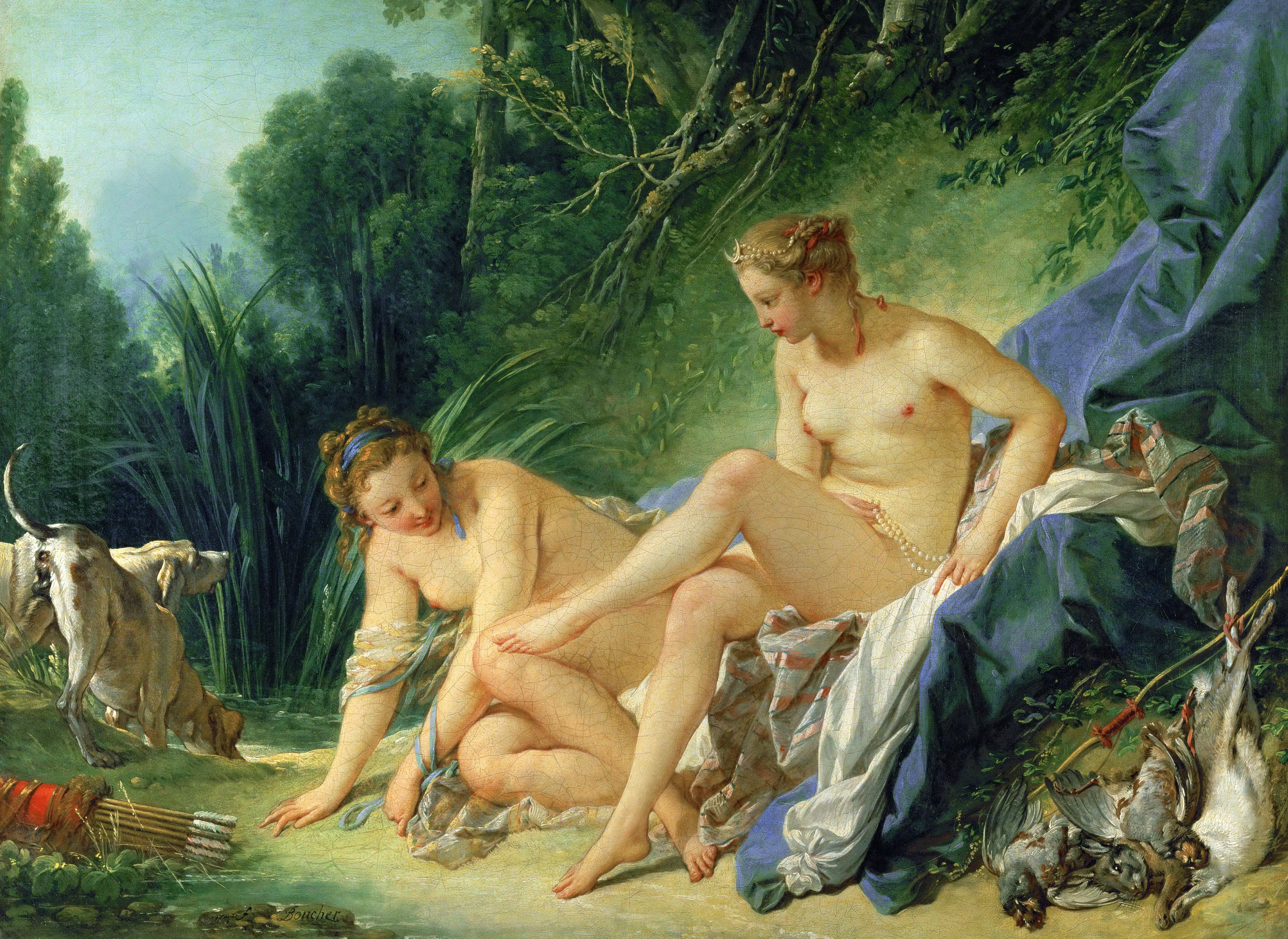
François Boucher's Diane sortant du bain (Diana Bathing) is accompanied by mixed-race nudes in the painting Diane des tropiques (Diana of the tropics).

As an extension of his series Paysages Mémoire, his new exhibition in 1987 in Paris at the Pascal Gabert gallery entitled Mémoires dénudées broadens his field of investigation by emphasizing on the nude. There were already nudes in his series Paysages mémoire, but they were in some way imposed by the quotes from his masters in painting, such as the nude of the luncheon on the grass by Manet in his painting Encore un déjeuner sur le sable or The Valpinçon Bather of Ingres in the painting Le bain à Barranco. This time he also undresses his contemporaries. Beyond aesthetic considerations, it is also a way for Braun-Vega to show his contemporaries in their ethnic diversity. He surprises the viewer by putting Boucher's Diana Bathing in the presence of two naked mixed race people and thus expresses, according to Julio Ramon Ribeyro, the emergence of a multiracial and multicultural world resulting from crossbreeding and syncretism. This does not exclude a certain dose of humor as in the painting Don Alfredo or Venus in the red room where he pictured Peruvian novelist Alfredo Bryce Echenique adjusting his glasses to better enjoy the view of the Velázquez Venus at her Mirror. And this also does not exclude adding other messages as in this revival of Las Meninas of 1987 in which he replaced in the mirror of the back of the room, the reflections of the king and the queen, symbols in this place of the omnipresence of power, by the pope receiving Kurt Waldheim while holding in hand the newspaper Libération headlining on the condemnation of Klaus Barbie. This painting entitled Double focus over the West denounces the power of the Church to exonerate a former Nazi of his faults and at the same time represents the ethnic diversity existing in a country like France.

==== The Madrid retrospective exhibition ====
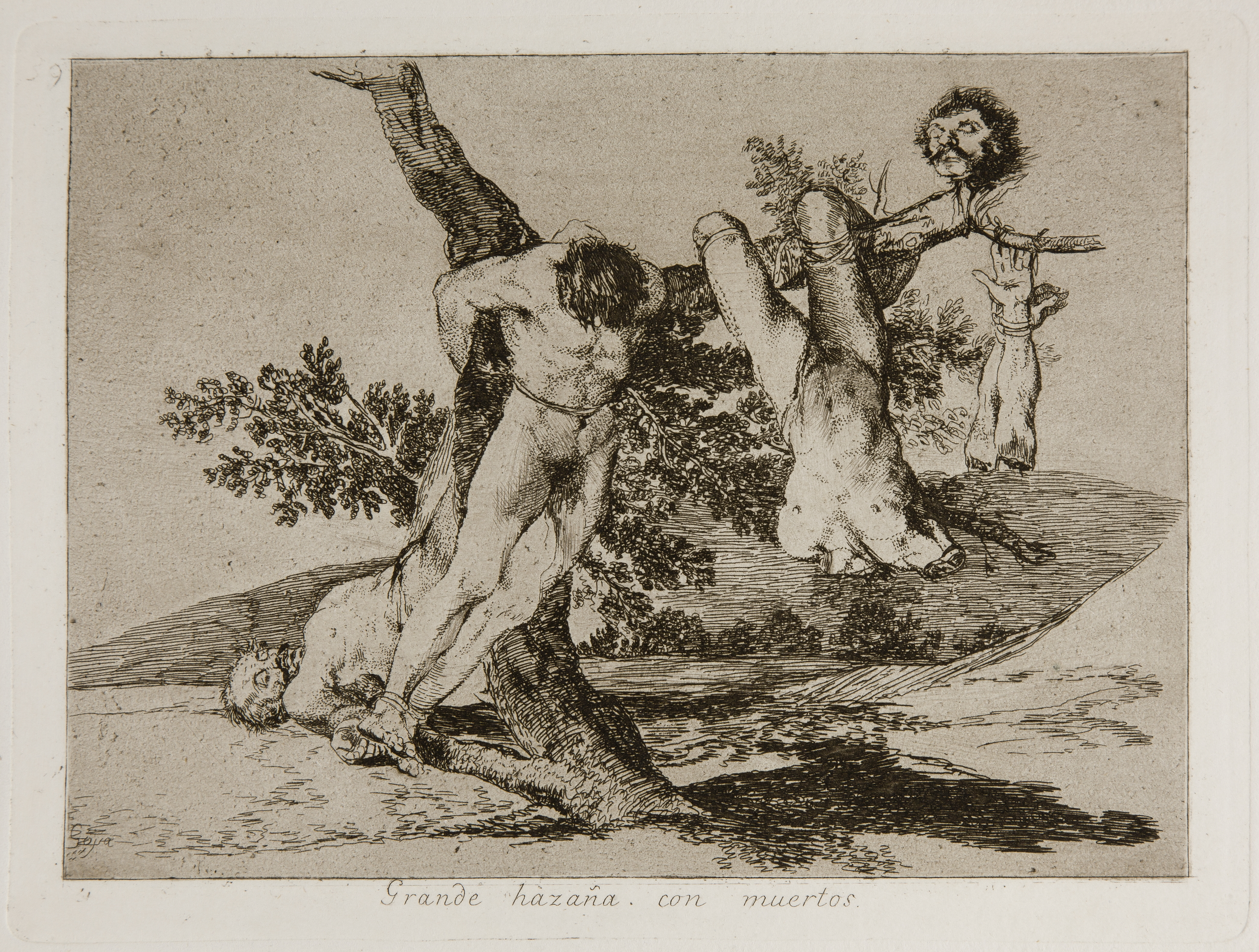
One of the many engravings by Goya used in the Peru-Spain series for the Madrid exhibition

After two first retrospective exhibitions in France, in Montluçon and Chamalières in 1987 and in Maubeuge in 1989, that of Madrid in 1992 was organized by the National Exhibition Center of the Spanish Ministry of Culture at the Spanish Museum of Contemporary Art in the context of the fifth centenary of the discovery of America by Christopher Columbus, an event which on the American side is rather seen as the encounter between two worlds. The work of Braun-Vega, which since 1980 has brought these two worlds into dialogue by bringing the works of the great masters of European painting into contact with the daily, social and political reality of Peru, was therefore perfectly suited to commemorate this event. Nevertheless, Braun-Vega produced a series specially for the occasion entitled Peru-Spain: bare memories in which he is particularly interested in the consequences of this encounter, as brutal as it was, and in the ethnic and cultural mix that resulted from it. In the introduction text of the exhibition catalog, Federico Mayor, Director General of the UNESCO, underlines the effectiveness of the pictorial vehicle that are the works of Braun-Vega to awaken the consciences of Europe to the realities of Latin America.

For the first time in this new series, there are references to the Peruvian chronicler Felipe Guamán Poma de Ayala, a half-breed who travelled throughout Peru to witness the living conditions of the indigenous people under Spanish rule. The ink transfers of the drawings of Felipe Guamán Poma de Ayala blur the line between the historical references found there and the artistic references to the engravings of Goya, between the history of Spanish colonization and the transfers of contemporary press articles. One of the paintings in this series, dedicated to Inca Garcilaso de la Vega, another figure of miscegenation, who unlike Felipe Guamán Poma de Ayala, left Peru to go and live in Spain, is part of the collection of the Casa de América de Madrid. Another, entitled La realidads...es asi! No. 2 joined the collection of the Hôtel Bertrand Museum in Châteauroux, France. A large part of the other paintings in this series were purchased by the Ralli museums and in particular, the triptych La familia informal can be found in the permanent exhibition of the Ralli Marbella museum in Spain among the five key works to know the Ralli Collection.

==== Still lifes as syncretic objects ====
Since the early 1880s, cultural and ethnical syncretism was expressed in Braun-Vega's paintings mainly by featuring europeans nudes of the Old masters with contemporary native and mixed race nudes. At the beginning of the 1990s, Braun-Vega introduced into his work a large number of still lifes in paintings, often smaller in size, painted on wooden panels augmented with reliefs which harmonize with the volumes and perspective of the painting. In doing so, he returns to this technique that he explored in 1972 in his series The Turkish Bath in New York, where the frame is an integral part of the work, spilling over into it and vice versa. But for all that, Braun-Vega does not abandon everything with which he has enriched his work in the meantime. Thus some of his still lifes enter into dialogue with those of Cézanne as in Bodegón con piña (1991) or Nature exotique (1993). But they can also be the foreground of a dialogue with Toulouse-Lautrec as in La Factura (1993), Picasso as in Nature tragique n°1, or Goya as in La realidad...es asi! No. 2 (1992) from the collection of the Bertrand Museum in Châteauroux. In any case, what the painter wants to emphasize through these sets of more or less exotic fruits and vegetables is that some of those that seem most familiar to us actually come from other continents. Braun-Vega tirelessly claims the syncretic dimension of his still lifes, even later when he reveals a still life in the middle of a much larger composition as it is the case in the painting Unexpected encounters on the Old Port (after Velázquez).

==== His collaboration with the French Ministry of Education ====
As part of a National Education project on artistic education aimed at making culture accessible to all, the Orléans-Tours Academy organized between 1995 and 1996 a series of exhibitions of the works of Herman Braun-Vega in 7 French cities (Orléans, Tours, Châteauroux, Rezé, Besançon, Bourges and Blois). It is because his painting, while delivering a vision of European culture coming from another continent, is perceived as an invitation to discover other cultures, that it interested the organizers of this program seeking to promote the culture as a vehicle of harmony. Braun-Vega is fully involved in the project. He willingly agrees to come and explain his paintings to school students who visit the exhibitions. He testifies to his mixed origins, explaining that he would not be there if the Spaniards had not discovered the American continent, condemning not the arrival of the Spaniards but only the violence which accompanied it and claiming the cultural miscegenation which resulted and which appears evidently in his works. He claims the duty of memory to avoid falling into barbarism, makes his painting a real means of knowledge and very conscientiously takes on his role as a teaching artist, going so far as to participate in student activities.

==== The master of interpicturality ====
Commenting on his painting Músico en el mercado, Braun-Vega said in the mid-1990s that he wanted to free himself from his usual references to Western iconography, retaining only the mixtures of style described by Jean-Luc Chalumeau. He said he decided to "inherit" from himself, focusing on the formal aspect of his own heritage as can be seen in some of his still lifes where there is no social or political content, nor references to Western iconography. This is the case for example of Mediterranean Nature (1993), Compotier aux chirimoyas (1994), or Mercadillo (1995), but these are not more than rare examples. Indeed the artist was "caught up", as he himself said, by his natural inclinations.

And indeed, apart from his portraits, his works from 1980 contain almost systematically pictorial quotations. So for some critics, appropriation is the main characteristic of his work. This characteristic earned him to be called "master of interpicturality" by the Chilean writer Roberto Gac, a term taken up by the press after the announcement of his death. However, the appropriation practiced by Braun-Vega is not only remarkable because it is systematic. The painter establishes a dialogue with the appropriated image which, placed in a new context, is charged with a new content, a new meaning. At the formal level, his art of appropriation is also remarkable for his mastery of mixing styles. Thus it is not rare that the art of Velasquez meets that of Picasso within the same painting always with the concern to get a coherent whole.

==== The liquid art controversy ====
Sociologist Zygmunt Bauman has qualified him as one of the most outstanding exponents of liquid art, in his work Liquid Life, together with Manolo Valdés and Jacques Villeglé. Bauman, who discovered the works of Braun-Vega at the Carrousel du Louvre at the fifth edition of the Art Paris fair, saw impossible encounters between contemporary characters and other characters from famous paintings from another time. He interprets these anachronisms as a loss of reference points in time and believes that these works are representative of the liquid world where time passes without moving forward, where beginning and end, progression and regression, learning and forgetting, merge making impossible any planning, any project. As soon as the book was released, Braun-Vega wrote a letter to Bauman in which he categorically refuted this analysis of his work, explaining that on the contrary he had been working for 35 years to denounce this liquid world, a world without memory. He also sent a letter to the publisher which would be published the following year in the book Arte, ¿líquido?. In this letter, to support his point, he takes up one after the other the paintings that he managed to identify based on the descriptions given by Bauman. He explains, for example, that the painting depicting Pope Innocent X, taken from a painting by Velázquez, holding in his hand not a statement by John Paul II as in Bauman’s description, but a newspaper commenting on pedophilia in the Church of the United-States is entitled Let the Children Come to Me..., an ironic title that uses a phrase from the Bible. In this painting as in the others, the anachronism introduced by Braun-Vega is not pointless. In this case it suggests continuity in history. Behind Pope Innocent X the figure from a painting by Caravaggio who was protected by Vatican dignitaries despite his dissolute life reminds us that the Church has always had a hypocritical attitude towards sexuality. Braun-Vega concludes in his letter that his art is the antithesis of the liquid culture defined by Bauman.

==== The painter of memory ====
While his work definitely shows off syncretism and artistic and cultural, ethnic and political miscegenation, the painter also shows concerns about memory. According to Braun-Vega, we're short of memory. The dramatic events in the news show that we are not able to learn from the past. Therefore, in order to alert us, he chose to fix the memory of some of these events in his paintings through ink transfers of press clippings. He wants to transmit this memory and to reach the widest possible audience, the painter seeks to activate the viewer's memory by adopting the strategy of "the three memories" that represent different gateways of more or less easy access to the content of his paintings. Braun-Vega identifies the cultivated or historical memory through the iconography of the great masters, the social and political memory through the introduction of contemporary situations and also the memory of individual experience, of everyday life. While the first is mainly accessible to cultured people who will recognize the references to the history of art, or be challenged by a feeling of déjà vu, the social and political memory is requested to anyone with the curiosity to decipher the press clippings transfers. Finally, the memory of everyday life is accessible even to children who will easily recognize what is represented thanks to the clear pictorial language adopted by Braun-Vega.

==== The game of filiations ====
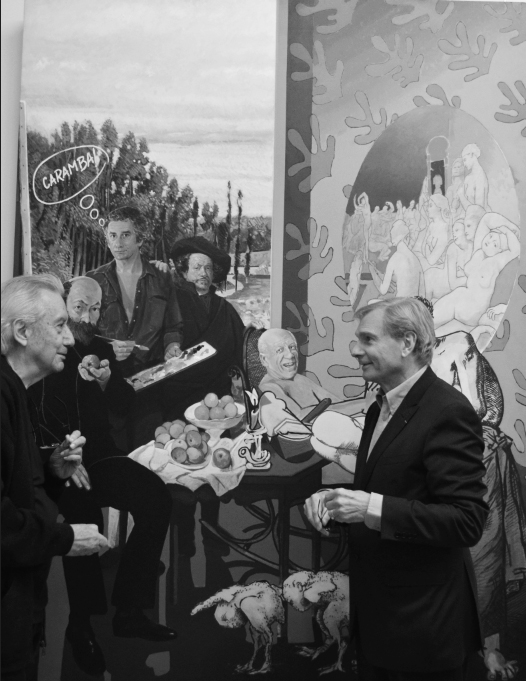
Herman Braun-Vega (left) with art critic Jean-Luc Chalumeau in front of the painting ¡Caramba!

After a series of exhibitions entitled Memories between 2005 and 2009 follows a series of exhibitions entitled Memories and filiations between 2010 and 2015. Since he began making explicit references to art history, Braun-Vega has been interested in the artistic filiations that exist between the great masters of painting. He had already explicitly revealed his masters in painting in 1983 in his painting ¡Caramba! answering the call of Jean-Luc Chalumeau for a collective exhibition entitled Tel peintre, Quels Maîtres?. But in his last years he repeatedly sought to highlight the filiations that weave his work. In such a way, his painting Que tal? Don Francisco à Bordeaux ou le rêve du Novillero is motivated by the successive influence of Vélasquez on Goya, then of the latter two on Monet and finally of Monet on Manet. Whereas the painting Paul retouchant un tableau d'Henri deals with the relationship between Gauguin and Matisse. And it is the double relationship of friendship and rivalry between Matisse and Picasso that he painted in the painting Don Pablo baila un huayno (danza andina de la sierra peruana) bajo la mirada sorprendida de Matisse. Braun-Vega considers that painters form a large family and this is the family he refers to in his Autoportrait en famille in which he depicts himself in the company of Picasso, Velázquez and Rembrandt.

== Awards and tributes ==
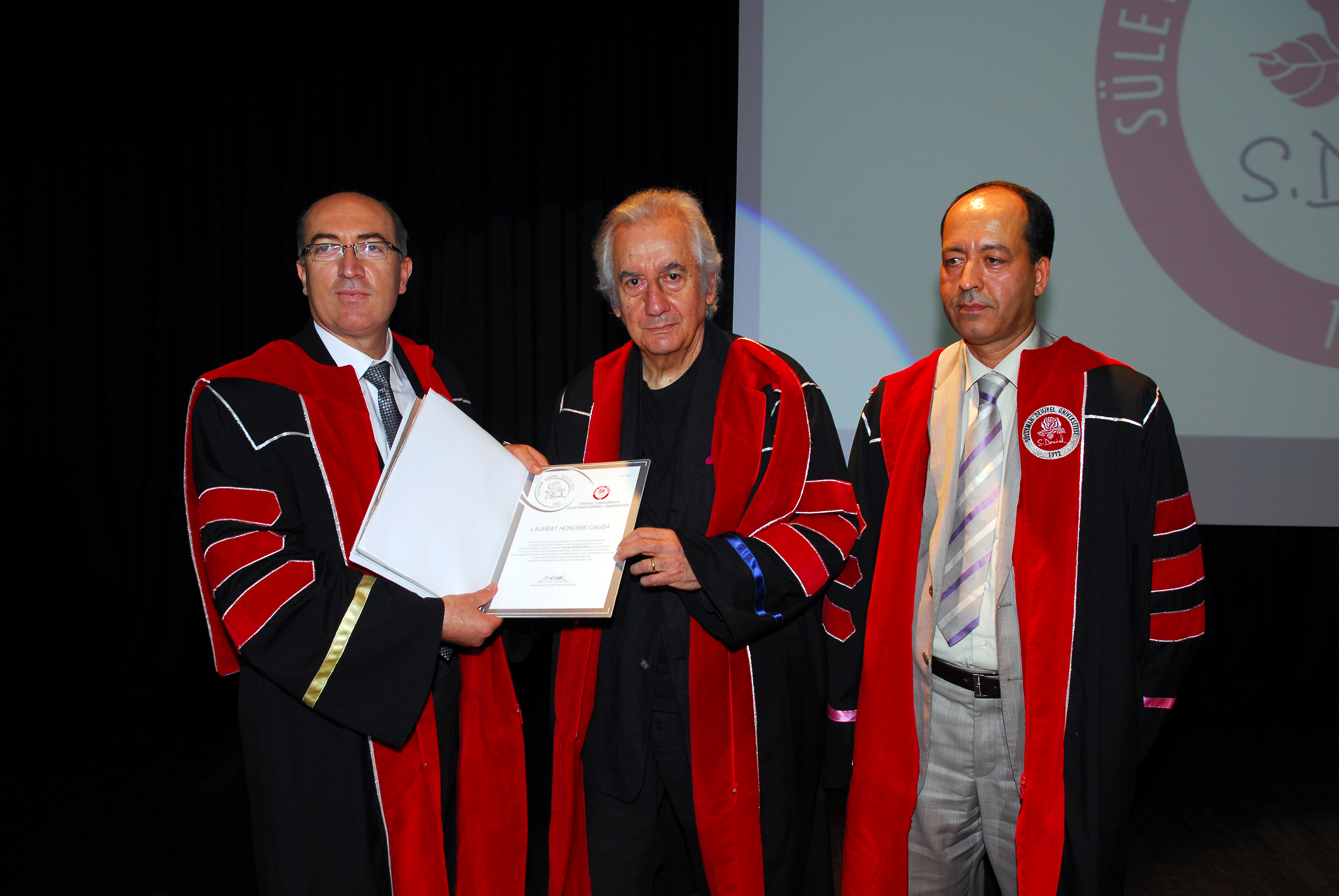
Herman Braun-Vega receiving his honorary doctoral degree from the Süleyman Demirel University in Isparta, Turkey.

- 1976: Jury Medal at the 4th International Exhibition of Graphic Art in Frenchen, Federal Republic of Germany.
- 2009: Honorary doctoral degree from the Süleyman Demirel University of Isparta, Turkey.
- 2010: Grand Officer of the Order of the Sun of Peru "Al Mérito por Servicios Distinguidos".
- 2017: Grand Cross of the Order of the Sun of Peru "Al Mérito del Servicio Diplomático del Perú José Gregorio Paz Soldán".
- 2019: Thirty-three artists pay tribute to him with the exhibition Herman Braun-Vega: vida y expresión de un artista del mestizaje at the Cultural Centre of the Pontifical Catholic University of Peru.

== Exhibitions ==
- 1965 : Galería Jueves, Lima.
- 1966 : HB66 : pinturas acrilicas, Instituto de Arte Contemporáneo, Lima.
- 1969 : Vélasquez mis à nu, Galerie 9, Paris. Galerie Club 44, La Chaux-de-Fonds, Switzerland.
- 1970 : Pour l'amour de l'art, Galerie 9, Paris. Galería Carlos Rodríguez, Lima.
- 1971 : Vélasquez, Manet, Cézanne, and Picasso Revised, Jack Misrachi Gallery, New York. Art Gallery of the Organization of American States, Washington.
- 1972 : Le bain turc à New York d'après Ingres, Lerner-Misrachi Gallery, New York.
- 1975 : L'enlèvement des sabines d'après Poussin, Galerie Isy Brachot, Bruxelles.
- 1976 : Galerie Lucien Durand, Paris.
- 1977 : Rembraun: Agressions, mutilations et faux, Galerie Lucien Durand, Paris. Galerie Krikhaar, Amsterdam.
- 1980 : He represents Peru at the 39th Venice Biennial, Venice, Italy.
- 1981 : Portraits de peintres, Galerie Lucien Durand, Paris. Galerie Mâcon, Mâcon, France. Buenos días señor..., Galería Camino Brent, Lima.
- 1982 : Papeles, Galería Forum, Lima.
- 1984 : Paysages-Mémoires, Théâtre du Rond-Point, Paris.
- 1985 : Memorias, Galería Camino Brent, Lima. He represents Peru at the 18th Biennial of São Paulo, São Paulo, Brazil.
- 1986 : CAYC, Buenos Aires. Museo de Artes Visuales, Montevideo.
- 1987 : Mémoires dénudées, galerie Pascal Gabert, Paris. Retrospective, Château et parc de la Louvière, Montluçon. Galerie d'Art Contemporain, Chamalières, France.
- 1988 : Feurs, France. La Galería, Quito. Paisajes Memorias, Museo de Arte Italiano, Lima.
- 1989 : Casa del Moral, Arequipa, Peru. Casa Ganoza, Trujillo, Peru. Retrospective, Musée Henri Boez, Maubeuge, France.
- 1990 : Galerie Pascal Gabert, Paris.
- 1992 : Retrospective, Museo Español de Arte Contemporáneo, Madrid.
- 1993 : Galerie d'Art Contemporain, Chamalières. Galerie Pascal Gabert, Paris.
- 1994 : Natures Mortes, Galerie Pascal Gabert, Paris.
- 1995 : Académie Orléans-Tours, Orléans. Bibliothèque municipale, Tours. Musée Bertrand, Châteauroux. A.R.C., Rezé. Galerie Écritures, Montluçon, France.
- 1996 : IUFM, Besançon, France. Container 96, Art Across Oceans, Copenhagen. Maison de la Culture, Bourges, France. Galerie Pascal Gabert, Paris.
- 1997 : Maison du Loir-et-Cher, Blois. Cellier de Loëns, Chartres, France. Arte B.A. 97, Buenos Aires. Galería de Santi, Buenos Aires.
- 1998 : Galerie WAM, Caen. Corderie Royale, Rochefort, France.
- 1999 : Galerie du Centre, Paris. Nohra Haime Gallery, New York.
- 2000 : 22e Moussem Culturel d'Assilah, Assilah, Morocco.
- 2000-2001 : Ralli Museum, Caesarea, Israel.
- 2001 : Erinnerungen : Synkretismus und Integration, Ethnologisches Museum, Berlin. Ibero-Amerikanisches Institut. Berlin. Galerie Wam, Caen. Galerie municipale Julio-González, Arcueil, France.
- 2002 : Retrospective, Maison de l'Amérique latine, Paris — Galerie du Centre, Paris — Centre culturel de la PUCP, Lima.
- 2003 : Artparis, Carrousel du Louvre, Paris.
- 2004 : Galerie Le Garage, Orléans.
- 2005 : Mémoires, Galerie Espace Croix-Baragnon, Toulouse. ST'ART, Strasbourg. Galerie IUFM-Confluences(s), Lyon. Galerie du Centre, Paris.
- 2006 : Galeria Dart, Barcelona, Spain. Museo del Castillo de Valderrobres, Spain. Musée du Château des ducs de Wurtemberg, Montbéliard. Bonjour Monsieur Ingres, Musée Beurnier-Rossel, Montbéliard.
- 2007 : Mémoires, IUFM, Rouen. Bibliothèque universitaire, Angers. Galerie Wam, Caen. Espace Saint-Rémi, Bordeaux. Galerie du Fleuve, Paris.
- 2009 : Mémoires, Maison des arts d'Antony, Antony, France.
- 2010 : Mémoires et Filiations, Galeria Marta Traba & Fundação Memorial da América Latina, São Paulo, Brazil.
- 2012 : Musée de Tessé, Le Mans. Mémoires et Filiations, Opéra de Lyon, Lyon, France.
- 2013 : Mémoires et filiations 1982-2012, La Corderie royale, Rochefort, France.
- 2015 : Mémoires et filiations, Galerie La Passerelle, Rouen, France.
- 2018 : Braun-Vega, fenêtres d’art, d’âme et de vie, Maison de l'Unesco, Paris.
- 2022 : De BRAUN à BRAUN-VEGA, Centre Culturel Anis Gras, Arcueil, France.
- 2024 : Herman Braun-Vega, Mémoires et Métissage par-delà les océans, FIAA, Le Mans, France.
