= The Turkish Bath =

Painting by Jean-Auguste-Dominique Ingres

- Le Bain turc (French)
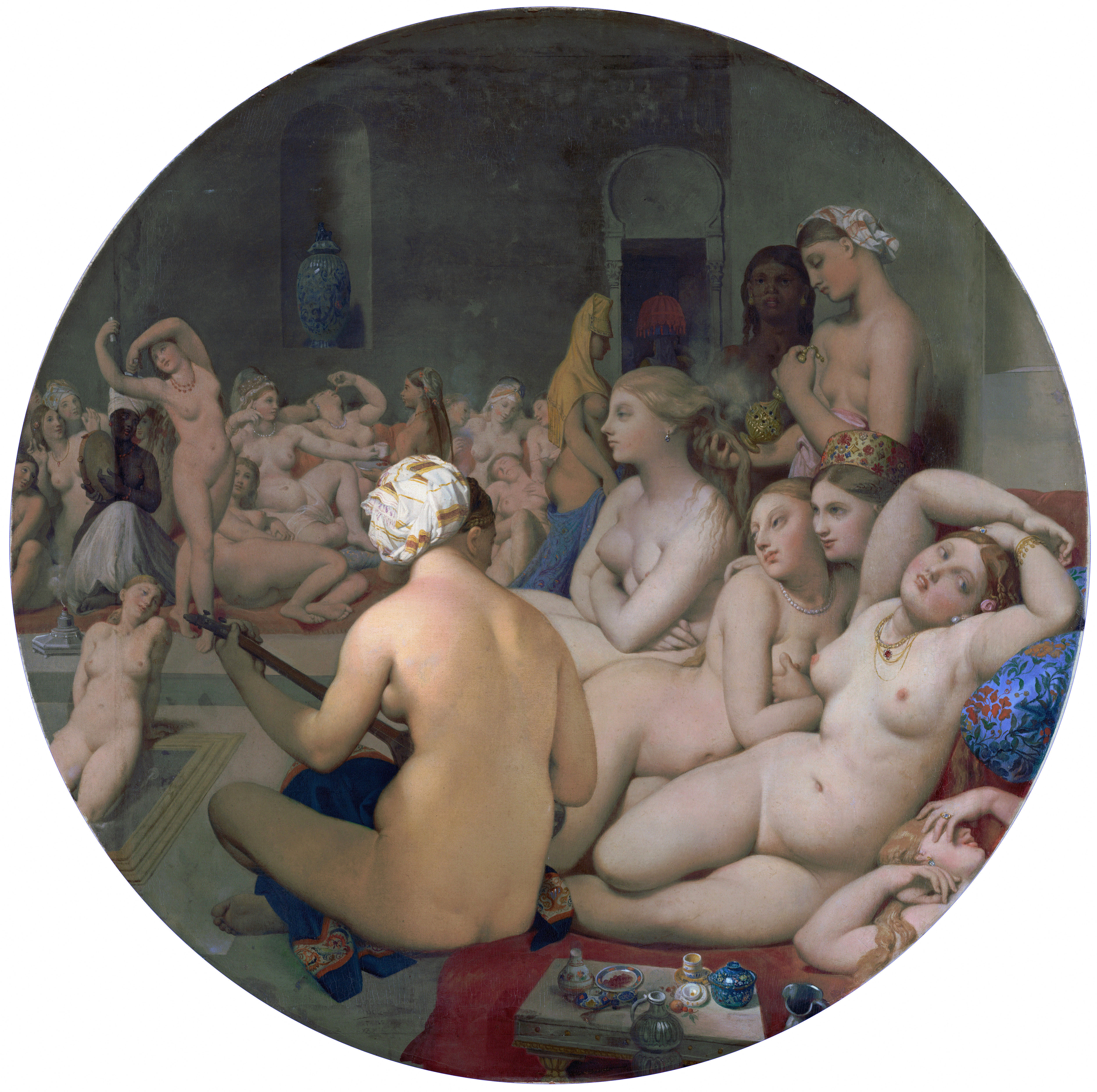
- Artist: Jean-Auguste-Dominique Ingres
- Year: 1852–59, modified in 1862
- Medium: Oil on canvas glued to wood
- Dimensions: 108 cm × 110 cm (42 1/2 in × 43 5/16 in)
- Location: Musée du Louvre, Paris
- Accession: R.F. 1934

The Turkish Bath (Le Bain turc) is an oil painting by Jean-Auguste-Dominique Ingres, initially completed between 1852 and 1859, but modified in 1862. The painting depicts a group of nude women at a pool in a harem. It has an erotic style that evokes both the Near East and earlier western styles associated with mythological subject matter. The painting expands on a number of motifs that Ingres had explored in earlier paintings, in particular The Valpinçon Bather (1808) and La Grande odalisque (1814) and is an example of Romanticism.

The work is signed and dated 1862, when Ingres was around 82 years old. He altered the original rectangular format and changed the painting to a tondo. A photograph of its original state, taken by Charles Marville, survives.

== Description ==
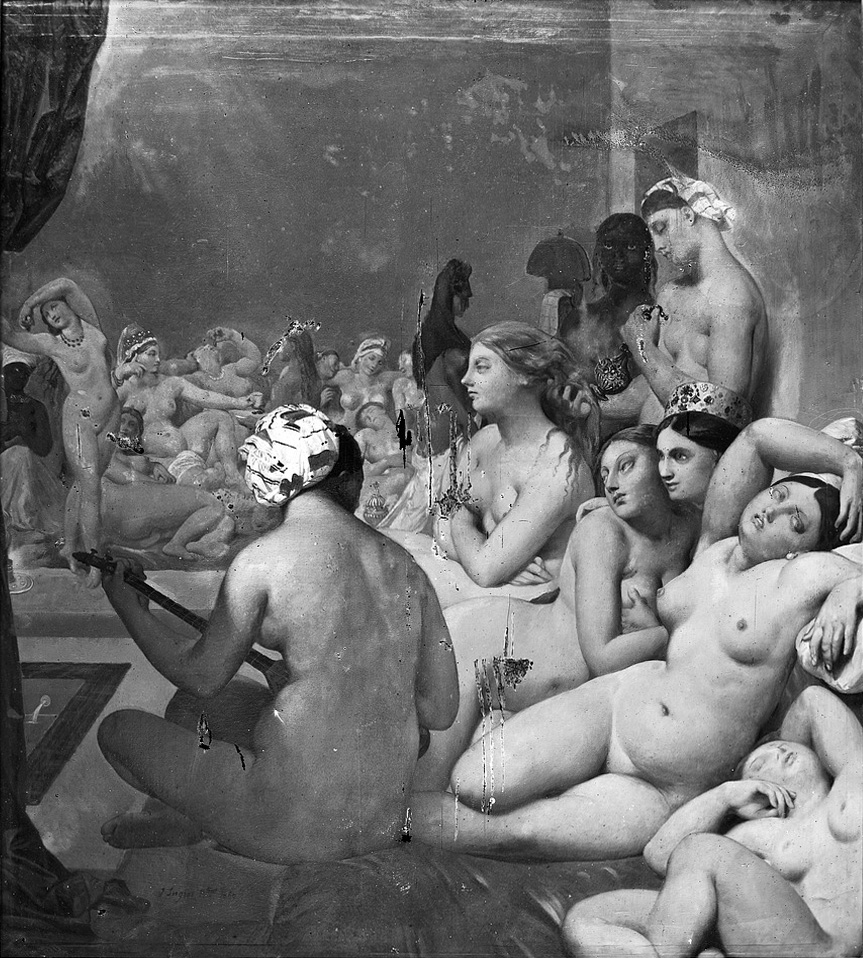
The original rectangular version of the painting

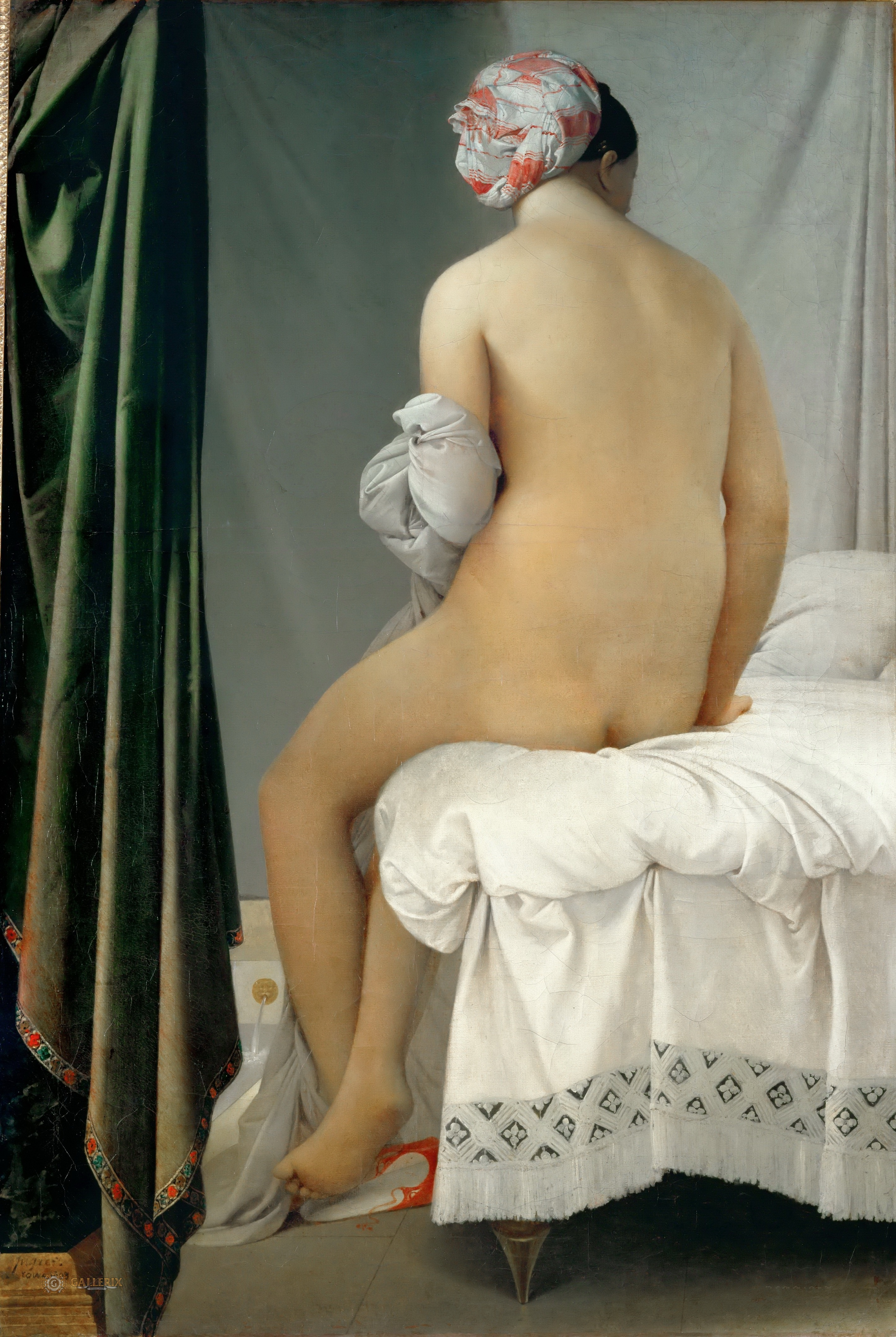
The Valpinçon Bather, 1808. Louvre, Paris.

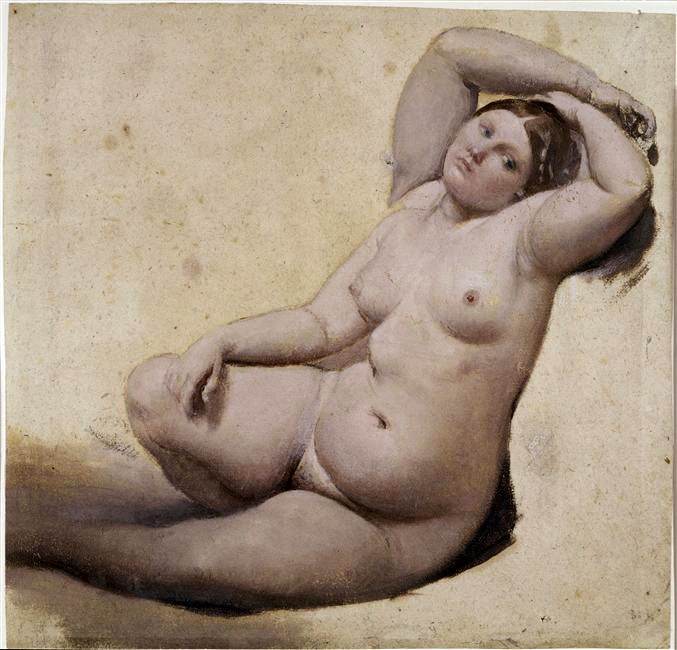
Woman with Three Arms (Study for The Turkish Bath). Musée Ingres, Montauban.

The painting is known for its subtle colourisation, especially the very pale skin of the women resting in the privacy of a bathing area. The figures are arranged in a very harmonious, circular manner, forming a "great curvaceous fugue" that heightens the eroticism of the painting. Its charge is in part achieved through the use of motifs that include the implied haze of Oriental perfume, and the inclusion of vases, running water, fruit and jewels, as well as a palette that ranges from pale white to pink, ivory, light greys and a variety of browns.

The choice to convert the painting to a tondo both centralises the composition and adds a voyeuristic element to the scene as the viewer observes the naked women through the oculus. This effect is highlighted as we know Ingres never travelled beyond Europe so his romantic vision of the Bathers is totally idealised.

Ingres relished the irony of producing an erotic work in his old age, painting an inscription of his age (AETATIS LXXXII, "at age 82") on the work—in 1867 he told others that he still retained "all the fire of a man of thirty years". He did not paint this work from live models, but from croquis and several of his earlier paintings, reusing "bather" and "odalisque" figures he had drawn or painted as single figures on beds or beside a bath.

The figure from The Valpinçon Bather appears almost identically as the central element of the later composition, but now plays a long-necked lute, likely a Saz or Bağlama. The woman in the background with her arm extended and holding a cup resembles the sitter in his portrait of Madame Moitessier (1856). The face of the woman with her arms raised above her head in the near right is similar to a croquis (1818) of the artist's wife, Delphine Ramel, though her right shoulder is lowered while her right arm is raised. The other bodies are juxtaposed in various unlit areas behind them. They include figures whose poses Ingres borrowed from engravings in a 17th-century book, Histoire générale des Turcs.

Ingres drew from a wide variety of painterly sources, including 19th-century academic art, Neoclassicism and late Mannerism. The colourisation is one of "chastising coolness", while figures merge into each other in a manner that evokes sexuality, but ultimately is intended to show Ingres's skill at defying rational perspective.

== Orientalist influences and a riposte ==
Ingres was influenced by the contemporary fashion for Orientalism, relaunched by Napoleon's invasion of Egypt. On leaving for Italy in 1806, he copied into his notebooks a text extolling "the baths of the seraglio of Mohammed", in which can be read a description of a harem where one "goes into a room surrounded by sofas [...] and it is there that many women destined for this use attend the sultana in the bath, wiping her handsome body and rubbing the softest perfumes into her skin; it is there that she must then take a voluptuous rest".

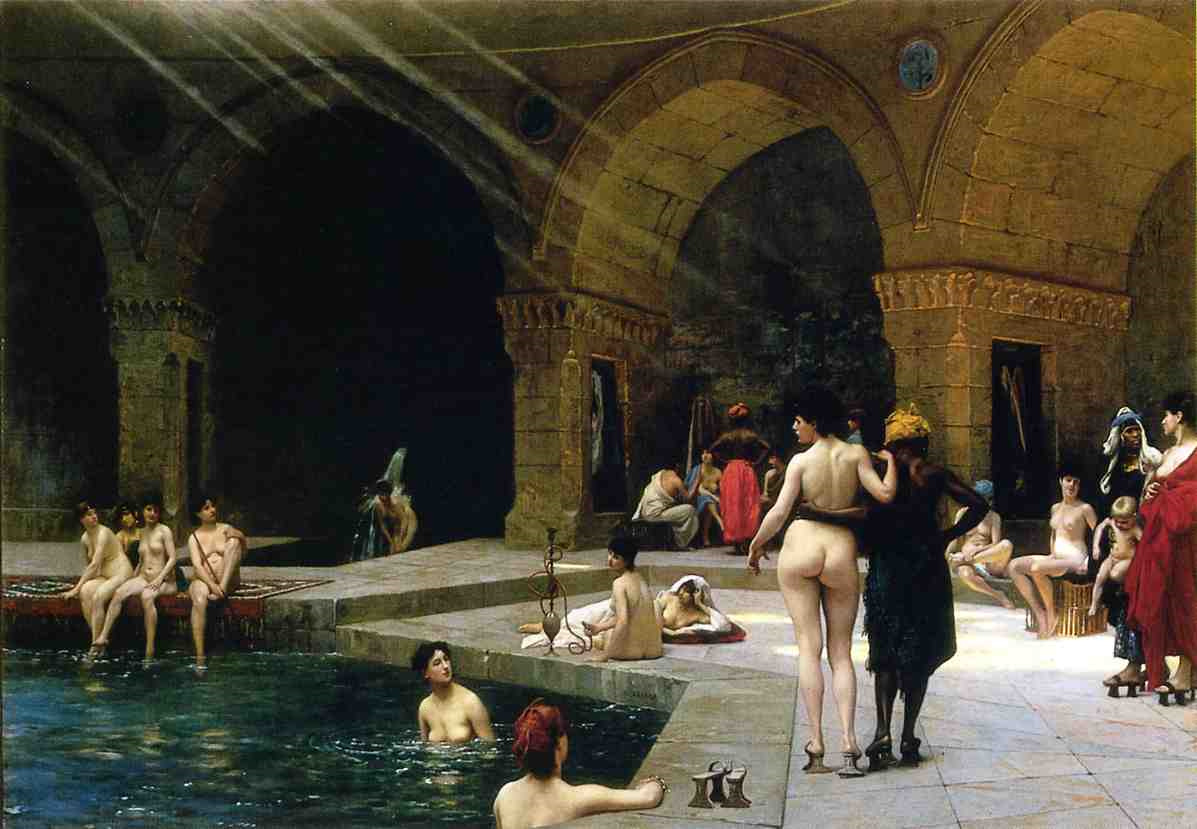
Jean-Léon Gérôme, Women at a Bath, (La grande piscine de Brousse, The Great Bath at Bursa) Salon of 1885. Hermitage, St. Petersburg Museum of Western and Oriental Art

In 1825, he copied a passage from Letters from the Orient by Lady Mary Wortley Montagu, who had accompanied her British diplomat husband to the Ottoman Empire in 1716. Her letters had been re-published eight times in France alone between 1763 and 1857, adding to the Orientalist craze. The passage Ingres copied was entitled "Description of the women's bath at Adrianople" and reads: "I believe there were two hundred women there in all. Beautiful naked women in various poses... some conversing, others at their work, others drinking coffee or tasting a sorbet, and many stretched out nonchalantly, whilst their slaves (generally ravishing girls of 17 or 18 years) plaited their hair in fantastical shapes." Literary critic Ruth Yeazell opines that the environment of The Turkish Bath bears little resemblance to the public bathing described by Lady Montagu.

In contrast to Eugène Delacroix, who visited an Algerian harem, Ingres never travelled to North Africa or the Middle East, and the courtesans shown are more Caucasian and European than Middle Eastern or North African in appearance. For Ingres the oriental theme was above all a pretext for portraying the female nude in a passive and sexual context. Exotic elements are few and far between in the image: musical instruments, a censer and a few ornaments.

In 1973, Welsh-born American feminist artist Sylvia Sleigh painted a riposte to the orientalist male gaze of Ingres with a painting of the same name. But her The Turkish Bath is gender-reversed, depicting male nudes, some in similar positions to those of the women in the Ingres original.

== Provenance ==
The painter's first buyer was a relation of Napoleon III, but he handed it back some days later, his wife having found it "unsuitable" ("peu convenable"). It was purchased in 1865 by Khalil Bey, a former Turkish diplomat who added it to his collection of erotic paintings.

Edgar Degas demanded that The Turkish Bath be shown at the Exposition Universelle (1855), in the wake of which came contrasting reactions: Paul Claudel, for example, compared it to a "cake full of maggots". At the start of the 20th century, patrons wished to offer The Turkish Bath to the Louvre, but the museum's council refused it twice. After the national collections of Munich offered to buy it, the Louvre finally accepted it in 1911, thanks to a gift by the Société des amis du Louvre, to whom the patron Maurice Fenaille made a three-year interest-free loan of 150,000 Francs for the purpose.

== Legacy ==
The Turkish Bath has inspired many modern artists. It can be seen in Félix Vallotton's 1907 painting Le Bain turc, in Pablo Picasso's Les demoiselles d'Avignon or in Tamara de Lempicka's Femmes au bain (1922). Its influence became even more noticeable from the 1960s onwards through numerous appropriations. Among the most explicit references to Ingres's Turkish Bath are Martial Raysse's Made in Japan, a Turkish and Implausible Painting (1965), Robert Rauschenberg's Revolver I (1967), Harry Nadler's Le Bain turc (1968) and, in the pop style, Robert Ballagh's The Turkish Bath after Ingres (1970).

It precisely is because so many artists have referred to it that Ingres's Turkish Bath caught the attention of the painter Herman Braun-Vega, who considers Ingres a pivotal figure between classical and modern painting. Le bain turc à New York is a series of 15 variations on Ingres's Turkish Bath created in 1972 by Braun-Vega for exhibition at the Lerner-Heller Gallery in New York. Braun-Vega moves Ingres's painting into modern contexts, depicting Ingres's bathers in scenes of everyday life in New York, on the streets, on the beach, or surrounding them with contemporary elements such as milk cartons and newspapers, creating a dialogue between past and present that is part of his exploration of the legacy of the great classics of painting in modern art. The notion of heritage is also central to the painting Caramba! in which Braun-Vega claims to be the heir of Velazquez, Goya, Rembrandt, Ingres, Cézanne, Matisse and Picasso, Ingres being represented by the Turkish Bath. When Braun-Vega does not use Ingres's tondo to express his artistic filiation, he can use it, for example, to express social criticism. Thus, in Le Bain à Barranco (Ingres), classical figures of The Turkish Bath are confronted with indigenous Peruvians, highlighting cultural and economic disparities. Other Braun-Vega paintings also refer to The Turkish bath, including La papaye au bain (Picasso, Ingres, El Greco), Le Bain à Cantolao ou 8,7 = rideau (Ingres), Etat critique (Ingres, Picasso), L'artiste et ses modeles (Ingres), Matisse maîtrise couleurs et lumières avec ses ciseaux.

== See also ==
- List of paintings by Jean-Auguste-Dominique Ingres
- Orientalism
- Hammam
- Seraglio
- Haremlik
- 100 Great Paintings, 1980 BBC series
