= Castroverde =

Coordinates: 43.031°N 7.325°W

- Municipality
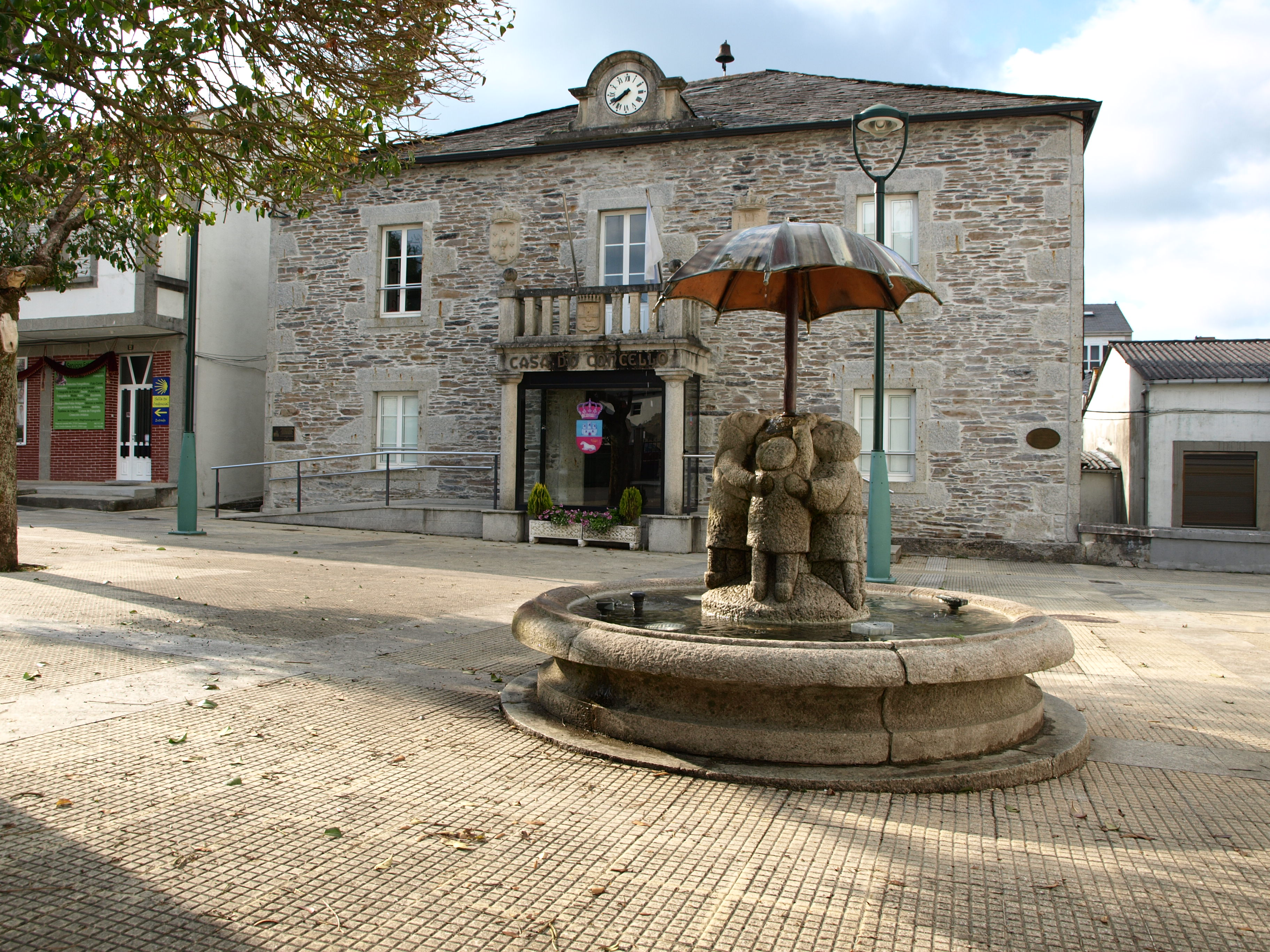

- Coat of arms

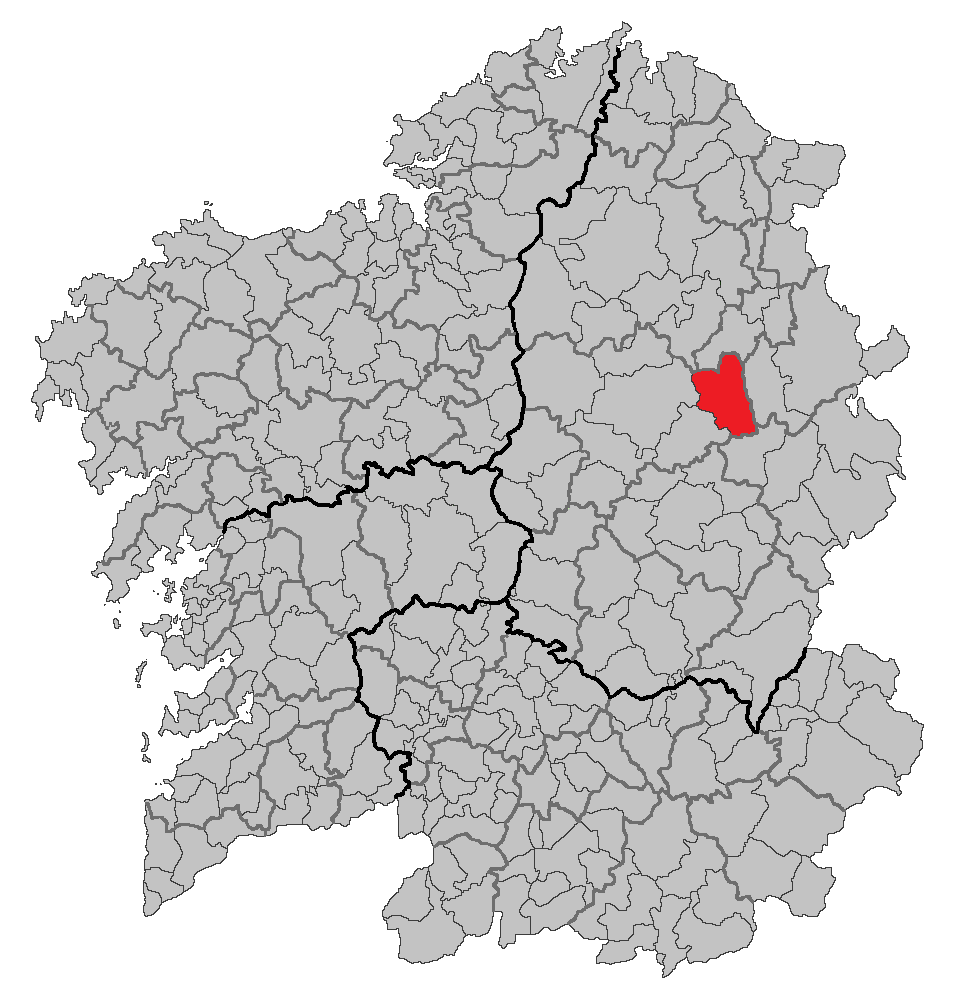
- Situation of Castroverde within Galicia
- Country: Spain
- Province: Lugo

Government
  - Alcalde (Mayor): Xosé María Arias Fernández

Area
  - Total: 173.5 km^{2} (67.0 sq mi)
  - Land: 173.5 km^{2} (67.0 sq mi)

Population (2025-01-01)
  - Total: 2,478
  - Density: 14.28/km^{2} (36.99/sq mi)
- Time zone: UTC+1 (CET)
  - Summer (DST): UTC+2 (CEST)

Castroverde is a municipality in the province of Lugo, in the autonomous community of Galicia, Spain. It belongs to the comarca of Lugo.

Castroverde is very rural area. The main economic activity is milk and meat production. There are also a few rabbit and poultry farms. Rural tourism has some importance with a few rural hotels. Because farming is increasingly automated, Castroverde's population shrank during the 20th century, and prospects say that this process will continue until the present century.

Administrative subdivisions are called parishes; it has its origin in church organization. These 37 parishes are rich in archeological vestiges, churches and chapels, waterwheels and pazos (a type of Galician traditional house). Remains of an important castle are also present in Castroverde.

== Geography ==
The territory is a transition zone between the plateau and the Sierras Eastern. The field is gaining height towards the east, Sierras de Moneiro, from O Mirador (with a height of 1034 meters in Pradairo), from A Baqueriza with a height of 836 meters and from Puñago. Numerous rivulets run down from these mountains. The rivers Guimaras, Azúmara, Romean, Outeiro and Tórdea are all tributaries of the Minho river.

The climate is oceanic with continental nuances. It has a temperature variation of up to 13 °C between low winter temperatures (5.6 °C in January) and mild summer (17.7 °C). Rainfall measures at about 1,000 millimeters.

== Historical events ==
The king Silo of Asturias, who reign from 774 until 783, overturn a rebellion of Galician nobles in the parish of Montecubeiro, Castroverde.

== Notable people ==
- Paco Pestana: Sculptor born in Peredo parish, Castroverde.
- Baldomero Pestana: Photographer and draftsman.
- Ricardo Gómez Polín: A philologist whose works include several on medieval Galician-Portuguese literature, the Way of St. James (especially the primitive route that goes through Castroverde), he also studied popular Galician traditions, crafts and archeology.
