= The Valpinçon Bather =

1808 painting by Jean-Auguste-Dominique Ingres

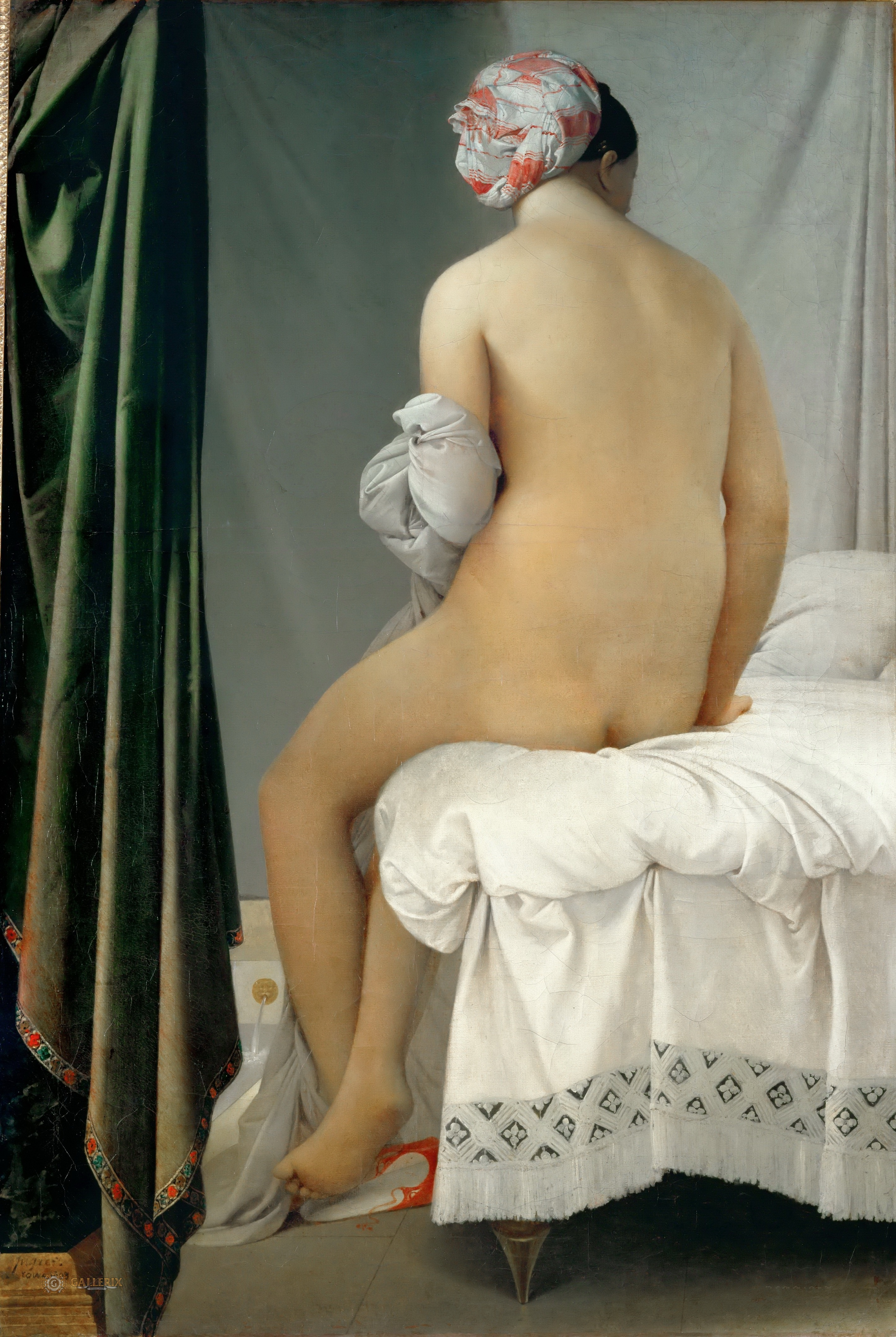
- Artist: Jean Auguste Dominique Ingres
- Year: 1808
- Medium: Oil on canvas
- Dimensions: 146 cm × 97.5 cm (57 in × 38.4 in)
- Location: Louvre; Paris
- Accession: RF 259
- Website: collections.louvre.fr/en/ark:/53355/cl010066528

The Valpinçon Bather (Fr: La Grande Baigneuse) is an 1808 painting by the French Neoclassical artist Jean-Auguste-Dominique Ingres (1780–1867), held in the Louvre since 1879. Painted while the artist was studying at the French Academy in Rome, it was originally titled Seated Woman but later became known after one of its nineteenth-century owners.

== Context ==
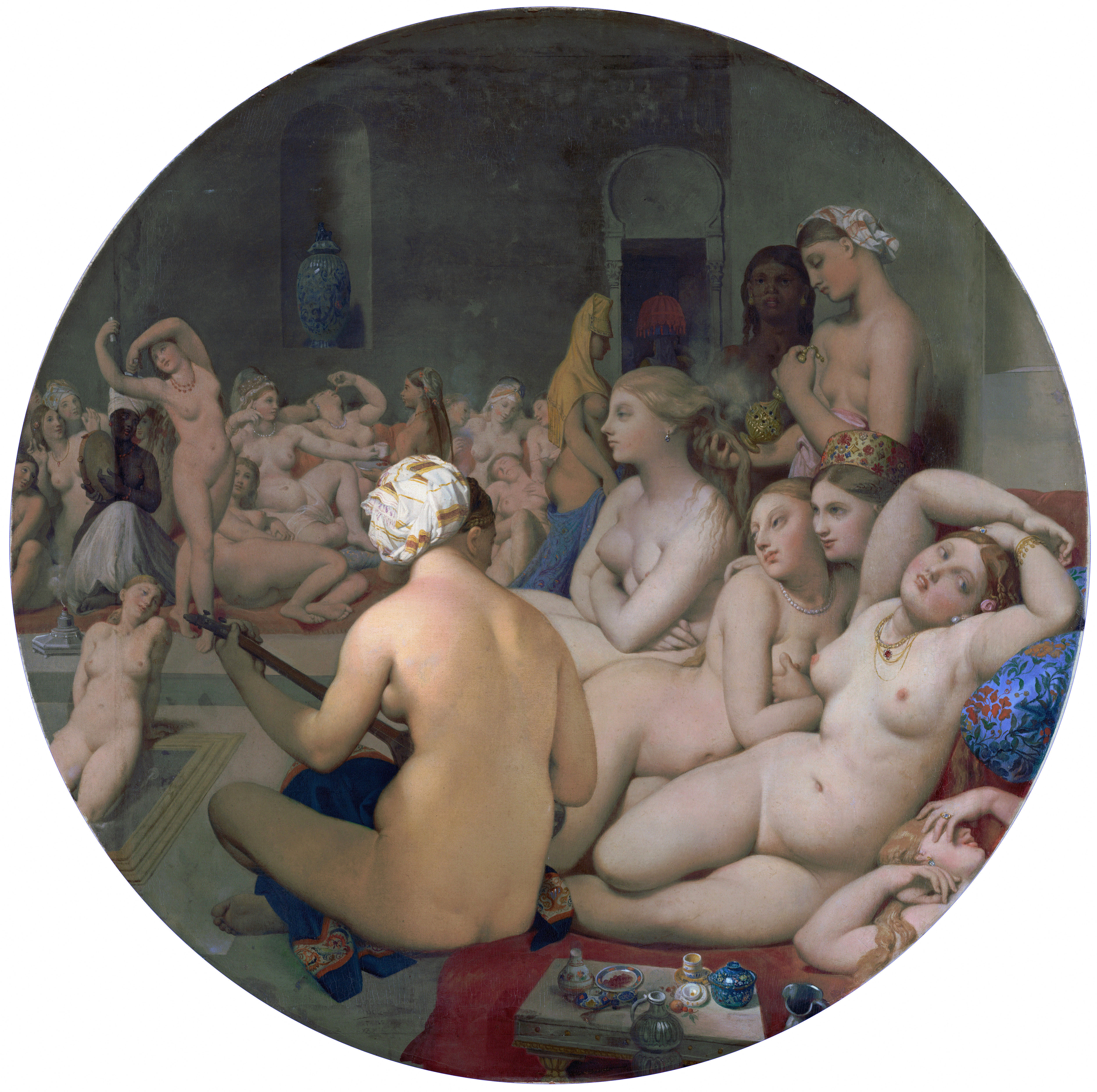
Ingres' The Turkish Bath (1862)

Ingres had earlier painted female nudes, such as his Bathing Woman of 1807, yet this work is widely regarded as his first great treatment of the subject. As in the previous smaller work, the model is shown from behind; however, The Valpinçon Bather lacks the earlier painting's overt sexuality, instead depicting a calm and measured sensuality. Ingres returned to the form of this figure a number of times in his life; culminating in his The Turkish Bath of 1863, where the central figure in the foreground playing a mandolin echoes in rhythm and tone the model of the Valpinçon bather.

== Reception ==
Although the painting was not met with favour by critics when first exhibited, almost fifty years later, when the artist's reputation was well established, the Goncourt brothers wrote that "Rembrandt himself would have envied the amber color of this pale torso", while the Louvre described it as "a masterpiece of harmonious lines and delicate light".

Charles Baudelaire (1821–1867) described the model as having a "deep voluptuousness", yet in many ways she is presented as essentially chaste. This contradiction is apparent in many elements of the painting. The turn of her neck and the curves of her back and legs are accentuated by the fall of the metallic green draperies, the swell of the white curtain in front of her and the folds of the bed sheets and linen. However, these elements are countered by the cool tone in which her flesh is rendered as well as by elements such as the elegant black-veined marble to the left of her.

Remarking on Ingres' ability to paint the human body in a unique manner, the art critic Robert Rosenblum wrote that "the ultimate effect of [The Valpinçon Bather] is of a magical suspension of time and movement—even of the laws of gravity ... the figure seems to float weightlessly upon the enamel smoothness of the surface, exerting only the most delicate pressure, and the gravitational expectations of the heaviest earthbound forms are surprisingly controverted."

== Influence ==
Le violon d'Ingres is a 1924 photograph by Man Ray inspired by The Valpinçon Bather.

There are more than twenty references to The Valpinçon Bather in Herman Braun-Vega's work. One of the first being in the painting Le Bain à Barranco (Ingres) from 1984 where she is depicted on a modest Peruvian beach.

== See also ==
- List of paintings by Jean-Auguste-Dominique Ingres

== Sources ==
- Rosenblum, Robert. Ingres. London: Harry N. Abrams, 1990. ISBN 0-300-08653-9
- Siegfried, Susan & Rifkin, Adrian. Fingering Ingres. Wiley-Blackwell, 2001. ISBN 0-631-22526-9
