= Diana Bathing (Boucher) =

Painting by François Boucher

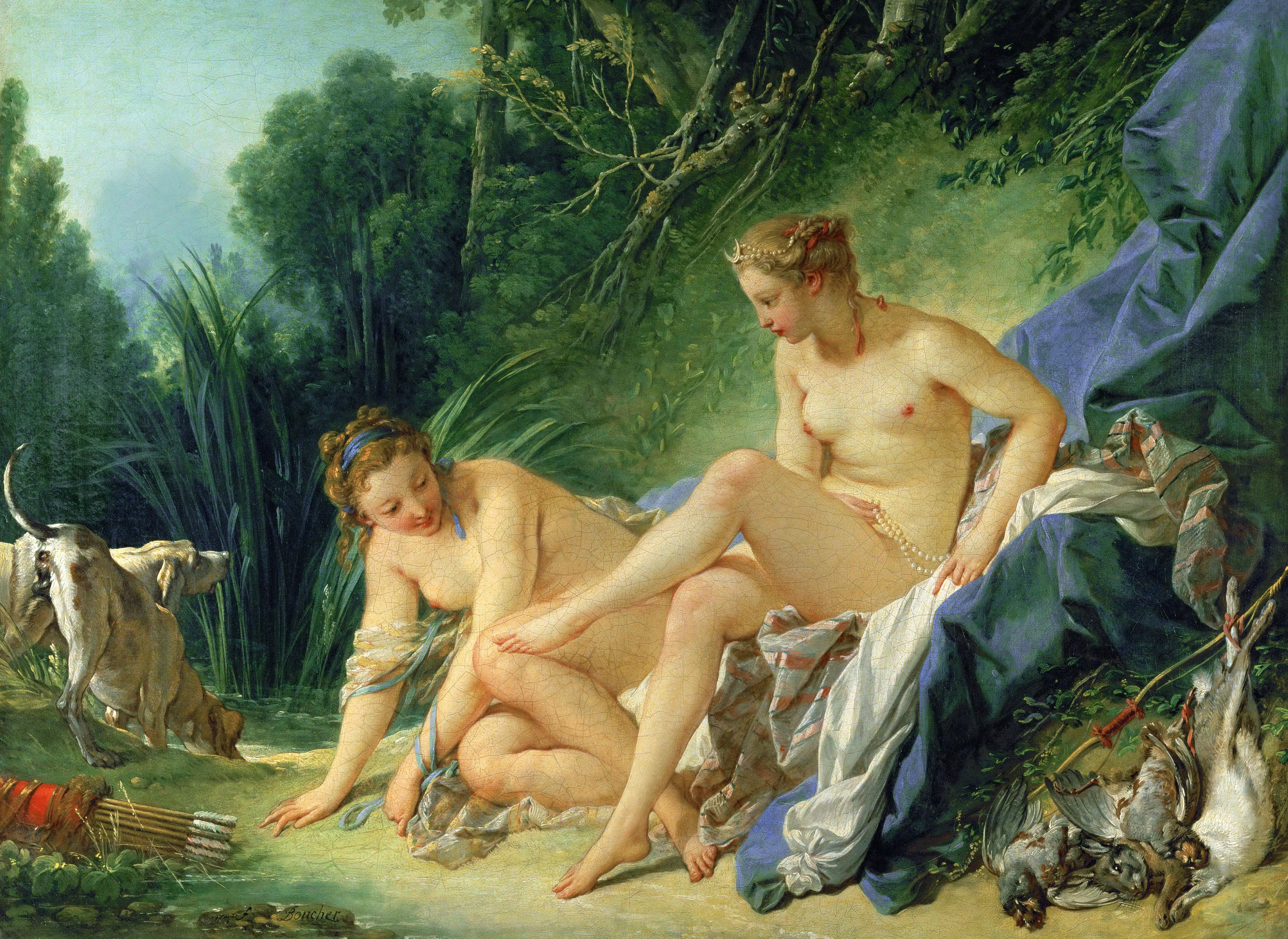
- Artist: François Boucher
- Year: 1742
- Medium: oil on canvas
- Dimensions: 57 cm × 73 cm (22 in × 29 in)
- Location: Louvre, Paris

Diana Bathing or Diana Getting out of her Bath (French: Diane sortant du bain) is an oil-on-canvas painting by French artist François Boucher, created in 1742. It depicts the Roman goddess Diana, with a nymph as her companion. The painting was acquired in 1852 by the Louvre, in Paris.

== Description ==
The painting depicts in the foreground the naked goddess Diana, having just come out from her bath, with a female companion. Diana is recognizable by the crown of pearls that she wears, with a crescent-shaped jewel, and is in the company of a nymph kneeling at her feet.

The goddess is nude, sitting on silks that enhance her fair complexion and blonde hair; the nymph, to her right, and left of the canvas, has dark hair, and observes the legs of the goddess. The bright skin tones acquire reddish reflections, in contrast to the bluish green of the landscape.

The fact that the naked woman represented is the goddess of hunting is evidenced by her attributes, such as the quiver with the arrows, the two hunting dogs, and some prey. Diana sits on a silk fabric that symbolizes luxury and contrasts with the rural hinterland. Among the hunted animals there are two doves – symbols of love – which were often an attribute of Venice. Boucher used a similar motif in his work representing Venus Consoling Love. On the left there are two dogs, one drinks water from the pond where the goddess has just emerged, while the other turns his head.

== Appropriations ==
In 1987, painter Herman Braun-Vega appropriated Diana getting out of her bath in his painting Diane des tropiques. By adding two nude mixed-race women also emerging from the bath to the foreground in front of Diana and her nymph, Braun-Vega expresses the advent of a multiracial, multicultural world. He repeated the process in 1989 in his painting La danse (Boucher, Matisse), adding the crossbreeding of Matisse's painting with that of Boucher.
