= Nicolas Eustache Maurin =

French painter (1799–1850)

Conquest of Mexico

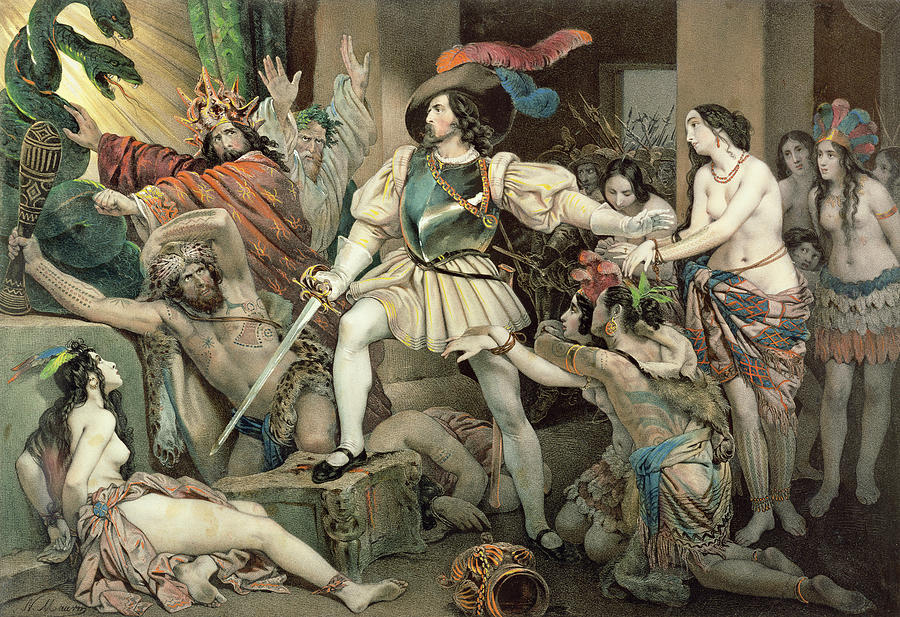
Hernando Cortes Opposed to Human Sacrifice

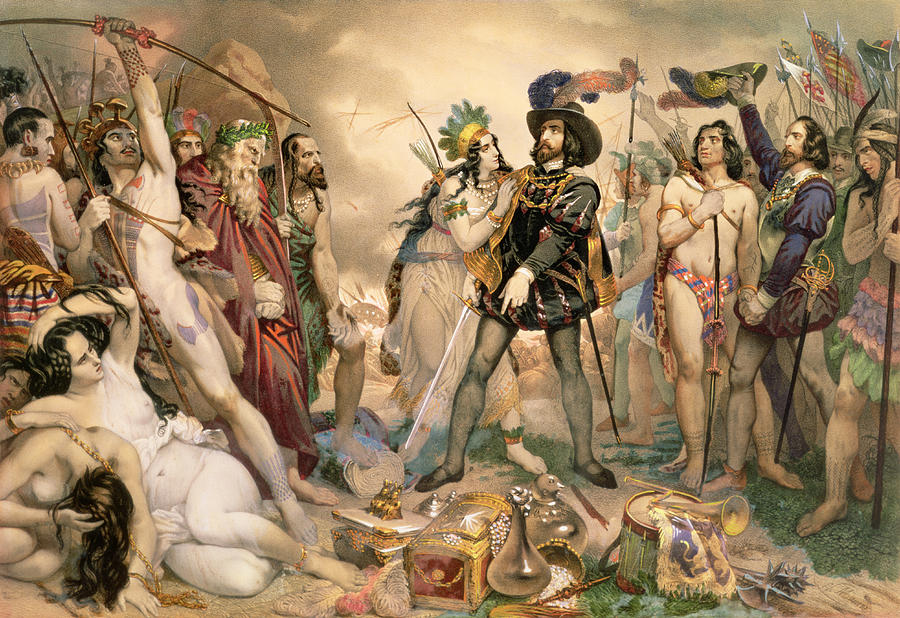
Cortes destroying his fleet at Vera Cruz, 1519

Nicolas Eustache Maurin (1799–1850) was a French painter, lithographer and engraver. His lithographs, particularly those characteristic of their period, are highly sought after.

== Life ==
Nicolas Eustache Maurin was born in Perpignan, Pyrénées-Orientales, on 6 March 1799. He was the younger son of the painter Pierre Maurin; his elder brother was the painter Antoine Maurin.

Maurin received his first artistic lessons in his father's studio. He received an allowance from the town and the department to study in Paris, which enabled him to enter Henri Regnault's studio as a pupil. He exhibited at the Paris Salon for the Salon of 1833, Salon of 1834, and Salon of 1835.

He established himself as a lithographer in 1830 and distinguished himself mainly with some amusing and erotic pictures of different types of women. He is notable as a painter of fashions and manners; examples include: Love, Modesty, Tenderness, Tender Avowal, Love Match, Nuptial Chamber, Day after the Wedding, Sacred and Profane, and Maternal and Conjugal Love.

He also produced the series Iconography of Contemporaries (Iconographie des contemporains), and a series of 163 portraits entitled Contemporary Celebrities (Célébrités contemporaines).

Maurin died in Passy, Paris on 7 October 1850, aged fifty-one.

== Selected works ==
Notre-Dame de Paris (1834)

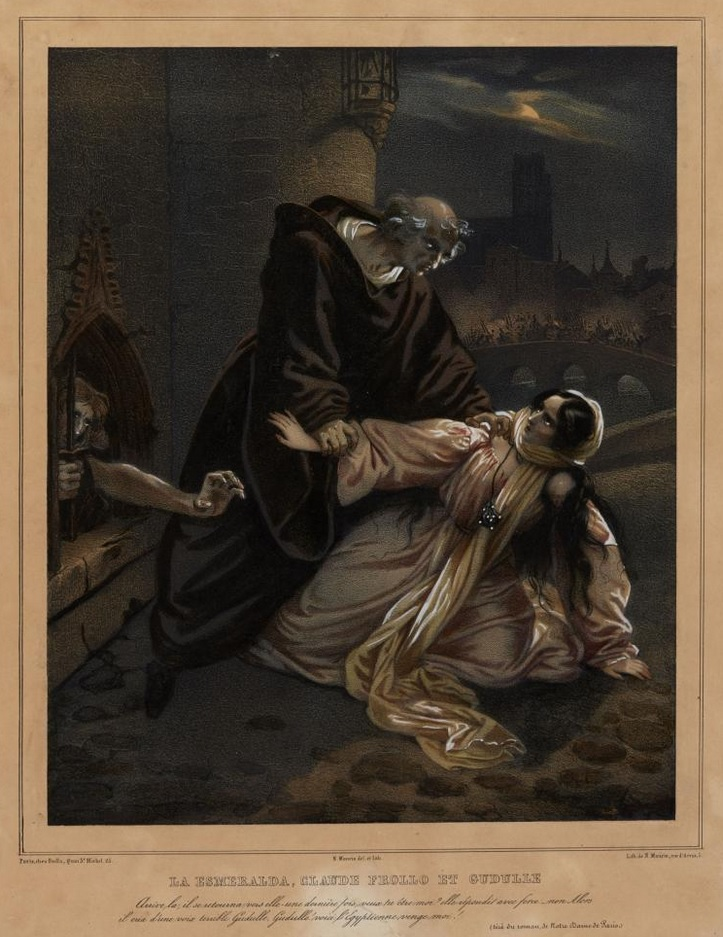
Esmeralda, Claude Frollo and Gudulle

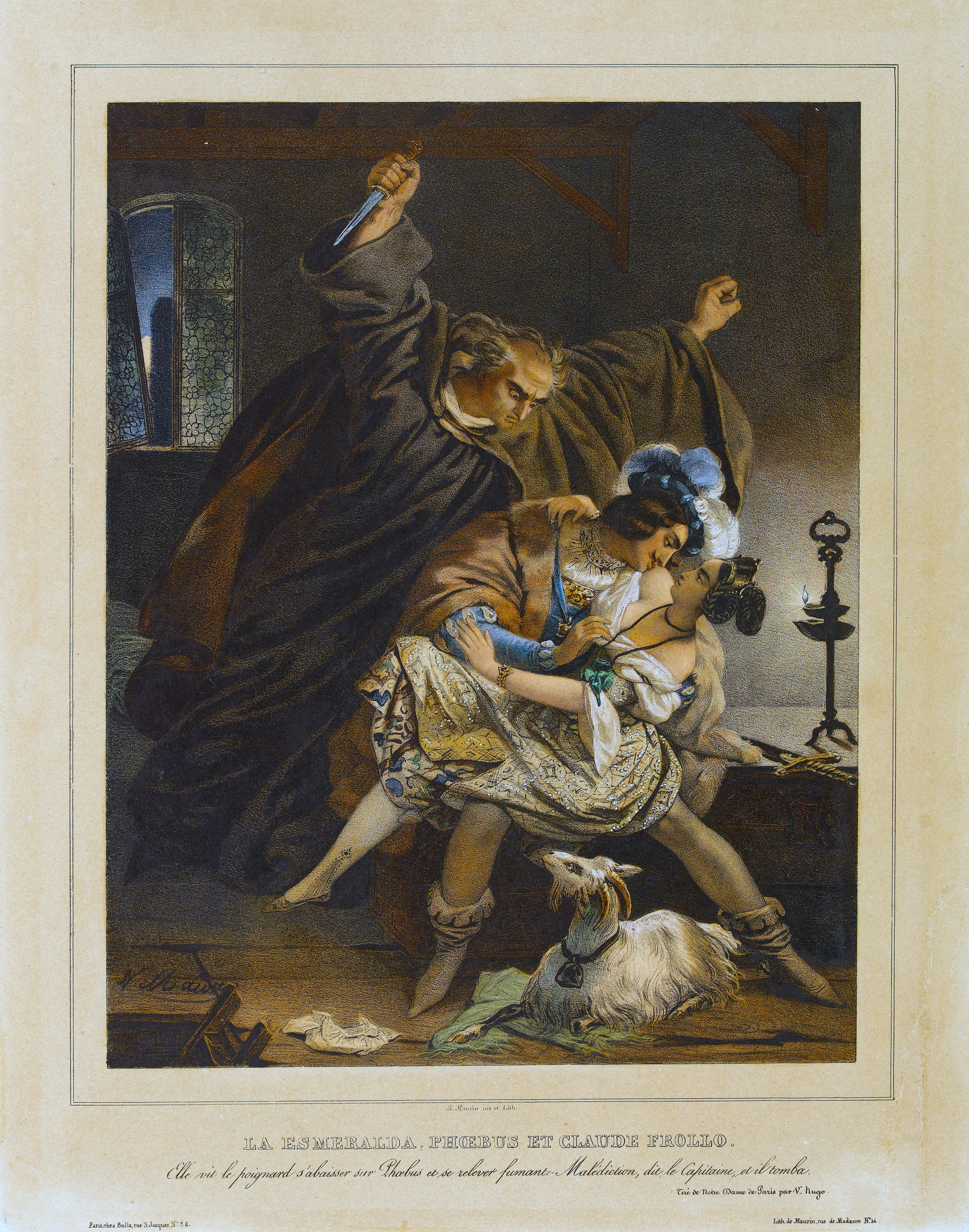
Esmeralda, Phoebus and Claude Frollo

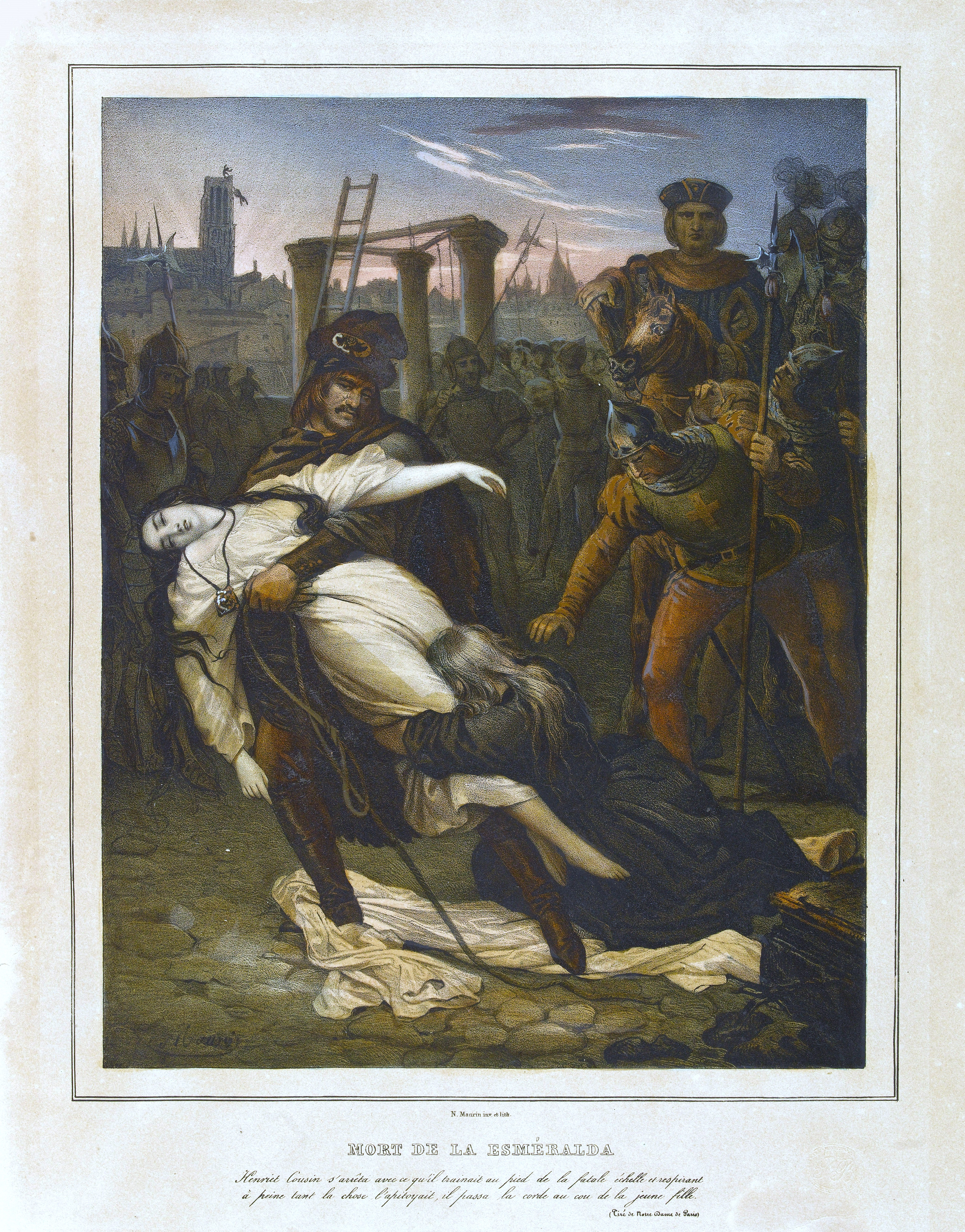
Death of Esmeralda

=== Portraits ===
- Portrait du général polonais Joseph Dwernicki (Salon, 1833, no. 2,899)
- Portrait du général polonais Pac (Salon, 1833, no. 2,900)
- Portrait du médecin français Gilbert Breschet

=== Illustrations ===
- Victor Hugo: Notre-Dame de Paris (Paris, 1831)
- Goethe: Faust. Une tragédie (Paris 1838)

=== Lithographs ===
- La toilette, after Prud'hon, 21 x 17 cm (Musée Baron Martin)
- Le triomphe de Bonaparte, after Prud'hon, 35 x 52 cm (Musée Baron Martin)
