= Cerebrospinal system =

The cerebrospinal system may refer to:

- Cerebrospinal venous system
- Ventricular system of cerebrospinal fluid
