= Cruveilhier–Baumgarten bruit =

Clinical sign of Cruveilhier–Baumgarten disease: humming sound

- Differential diagnosis: Cruveilhier–Baumgarten disease

The Cruveilhier–Baumgarten bruit is a clinical sign which can be found in Cruveilhier–Baumgarten disease. In this condition there are prominent umbilical and paraumbilical veins; auscultation over these vessels may reveal a humming sound (i.e. a bruit).

The sign was named after Jean Cruveilhier and Paul Clemens von Baumgarten.
