= Cruveilhier–Baumgarten disease =

- Other names: Pégot-Cruveilhier–Baumgarten disease
- Specialty: Hepatology
- Named after: Jean Cruveilhier; Paul Clemens von Baumgarten

Cruveilhier–Baumgarten disease or Pégot-Cruveilhier–Baumgarten disease is a rare medical condition in which the umbilical or paraumbilical veins are distended, with an abdominal wall bruit (the Cruveilhier-Baumgarten bruit) and palpable thrill, portal hypertension with splenomegaly, hypersplenism and oesophageal varices, with a normal or small liver. The presence of the Cruveilhier-Baumgarten venous hum is highly suggestive of portal hypertension, and is never a normal physical examination finding.

It was first described by Pégot in 1833, and then by Jean Cruveilhier (1835) and Paul Clemens von Baumgarten (1907).

Armstrong et al. (1942) and Steinburg and Galambos (1967) described two different types of the condition:

- Cruveilhier–Baumgarten syndrome: liver cirrhosis or portal hypertension is the cause of the distension of the paraumbilical veins (i.e. an acquired condition in which the veins reopen due to high portal pressure).
- Cruveilhier–Baumgarten disease: the distension of the paraumbilical veins is due to failure of umbilical vein closure, with little or no evidence of liver disease found on liver biopsy (i.e. a congenital patency of the umbilical vein leading to portal hypertension).

== Signs and symptoms ==
Symptoms of Cruveilhier–Baumgarten disease include the manifestation of a venous hum at the para-umbilical circulation site, often accompanied by a thrill, splenomegaly, atrophy of the liver, portal hypertension, and prominent para-umbilical veins.

== See also ==
- Portal hypertension
- Splenomegaly
