= Antoine Maurin (lithographer) =

French lithographer (1793–1860)

- Born: 5 November 1793; Perpignan, France
- Died: 21 September 1860 (aged 66); Paris, France

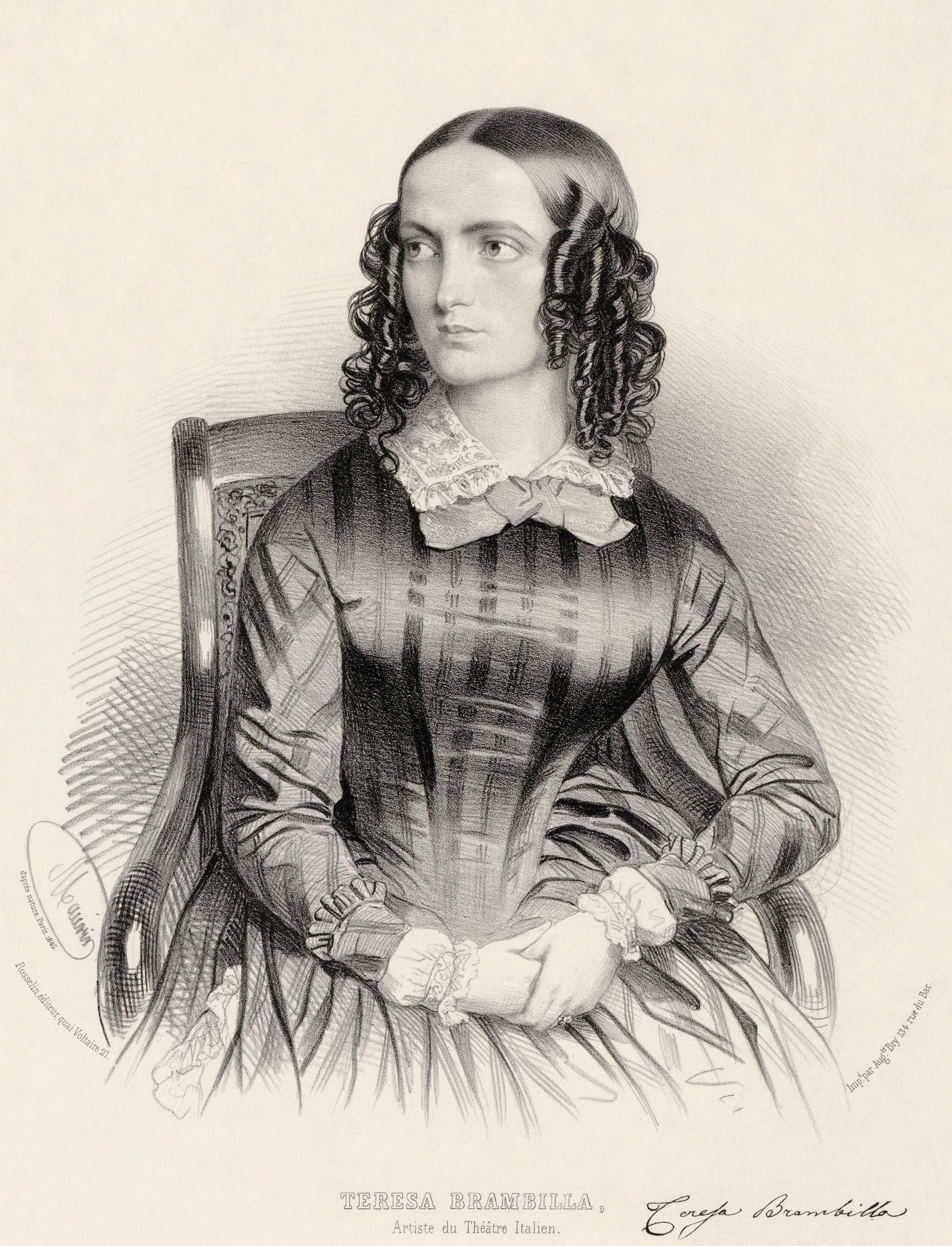
Portrait of soprano Teresa Brambilla by Maurin (1845)

Antoine Maurin (French pronunciation: [ɑ̃twan moʁɛ̃]; 5 November 1793 – 21 September 1860) was a French lithographer. He was the son of Pierre Maurin, and brother of Nicolas Eustache Maurin.
