= Jean Cruveilhier =

French anatomist and pathologist (1791–1874)

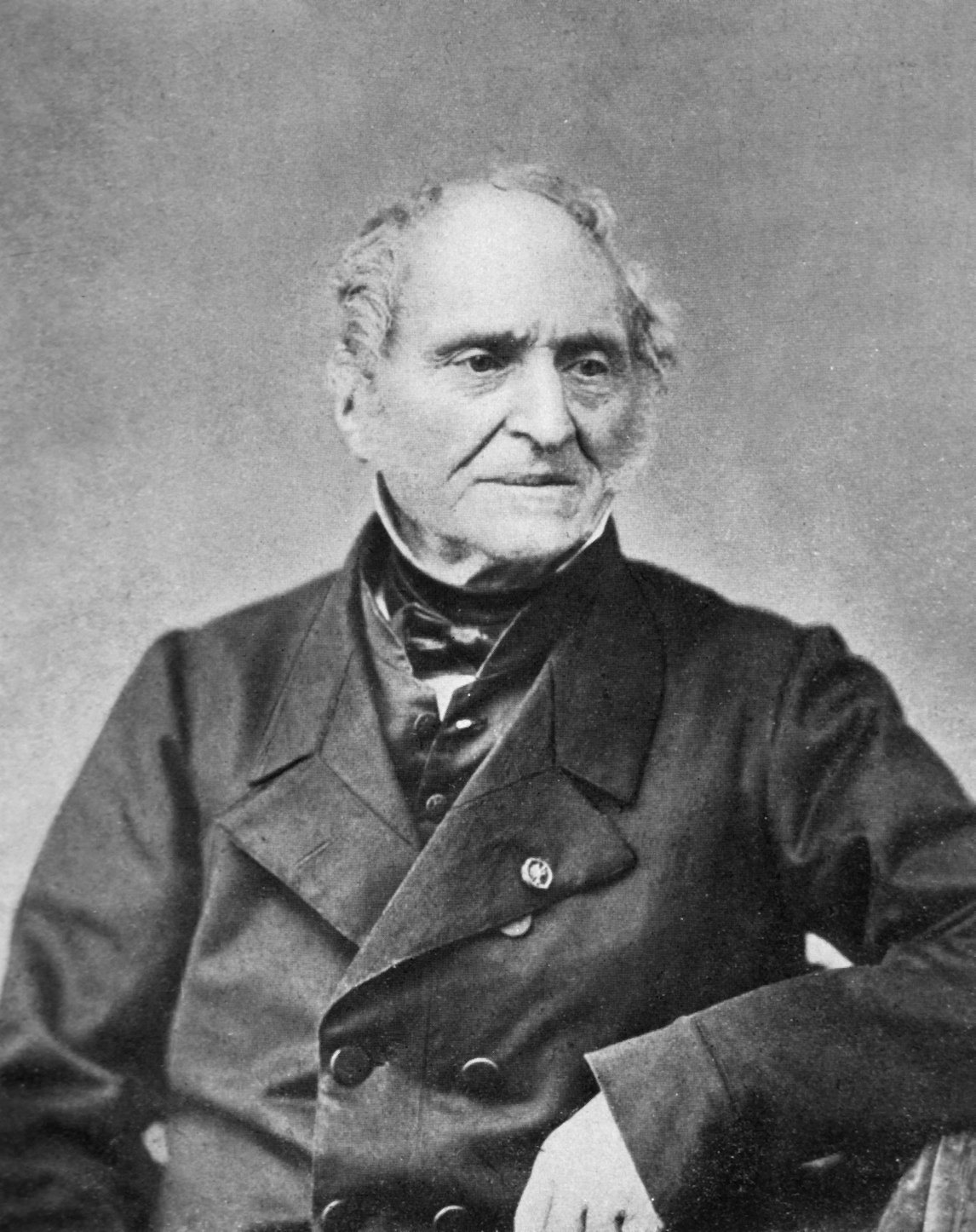
- Born: 9 February 1791; Limoges, France
- Died: 7 March 1874 (aged 83); Sussac, Haute-Vienne, France
- Education: University of Paris
- Known for: Studies of the nervous system
- Awards: Elected to the Académie de Médecine, later its president; president of the Société anatomique
- Scientific career
- Fields: Anatomy, pathology
- Workplaces: Paris
- Notable students: Ramón Emeterio Betances

Jean Cruveilhier (French pronunciation: [kʁyveje]; 9 February 1791 – 7 March 1874) was a French anatomist and pathologist.

== Academic career ==
Cruveilhier was born in Limoges, France. As a student in Limoges, he planned to enter the priesthood. He later developed an interest in pathology, being influenced by Guillaume Dupuytren (1777-1835), a friend of Cruveilhier's father. In 1816 he earned his medical doctorate in Paris, where in 1825 he succeeded Pierre Augustin Béclard (1785–1825) as professor of anatomy. In 1836 he relinquished the chair of anatomy to Gilbert Breschet (1784–1845), and in doing so, became the first occupant of the recently founded chair of pathological anatomy.

In 1836 he was elected to the Académie de Médecine, becoming its president in 1839. For over forty years he was president of the Société anatomique. Puerto Rican pro-independence leader, surgeon and Légion d'honneur laureate, Ramón Emeterio Betances, was one of his prominent students. He died, aged 83, in Sussac.

== Contributions ==
He was a highly influential anatomist, making important contributions in his study of the nervous system. Jean-Martin Charcot (1825-1893) credits Cruveilhier as being the first to describe lesions associated with what today is known as multiple sclerosis, of which were depicted in Cruveilhier's Anatomie pathologique du corps humain (two volumes 1829-1835, 1835-1842). Cruveilhier is also credited as being the first to provide a pathological account of the disease.

Cruveilhier was an opponent of large maternity hospitals, favoring home care as well as smaller hospitals with private rooms for women in labor. He performed extensive research involving the vascular system, being remembered for his studies of phlebitis, which he believed to "dominate all of pathology".

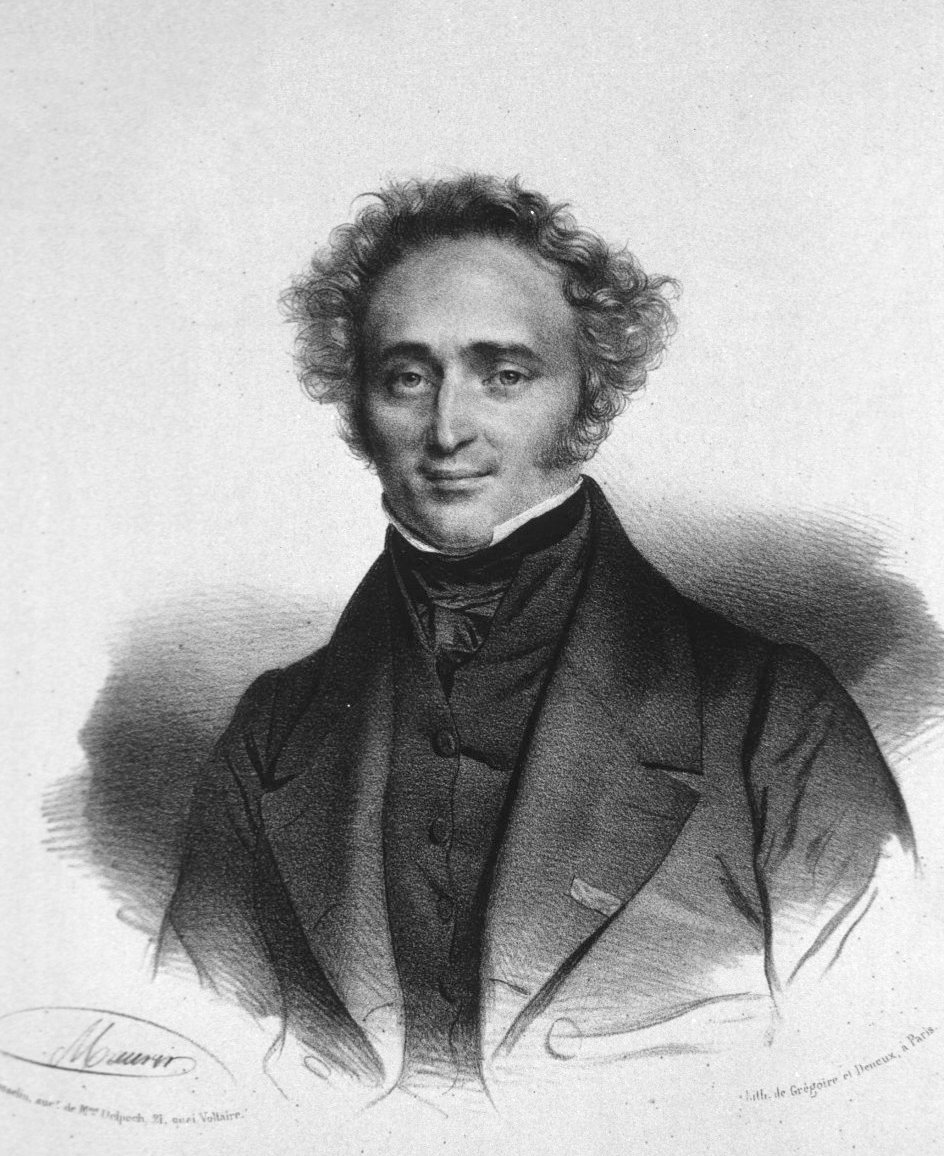
Jean Cruveilhier 1837

His name is associated with Cruveilhier's sign (persistent hypertension and occlusion of the portal vein) and Cruveilhier–Baumgarten disease (cirrhosis of the liver without ascites), a condition named with German pathologist Paul Clemens von Baumgarten (1848-1928). Cruveilhier's name is also associated with several parts of the anatomy; however, these terms have largely been replaced by the modern anatomical nomenclature:

- Cruveilhier's fossa: scaphoid fossa of sphenoid bone.
- Cruveilhier's fascia: superficial fascia of perineum.
- Cruveilhier's joint: median atlanto-axial joint.
- Cruveilhier's plexus: posterior cervical plexus, plexus formed by the dorsal rami of the first three spinal nerves.

== Partial list of written works ==
- Anatomie descriptive (1834–1836).
- Anatomie pathologique du corps humain (1829–1842), with over 200 copper plates illustrated by Antoine Chazal (1793–1854).
- Vie de Dupuytren (Life of Dupuytren, 1840), a book that was a memorial to his mentor.
- Traité d'anatomie pathologique génerale (1849–1864).
- Anatomie du système nerveux de l'homme (1845).
- Traité d'anatomie descriptive (1851).
- The Anatomy of the Human Body (1844), The First American Edition, From the Last Paris Edition, Edited by Granville Sharp Pattison, M.D., New York: Published by Harper & Brothers, No. 82 Cliff-Street (1844), Illustrated with numerous woodcuts from the best anatomical engravings.

== See also ==
- Pathology
- List of pathologists
