= Franz Tangl =

Hungarian physiologist and pathologist

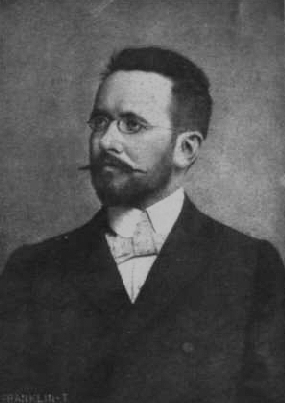
Franz Tangl.

Franz Tangl (Budapest, 26 January 1866 – Budapest, 19 December 1917) was a Hungarian physiologist and pathologist, member of the Hungarian Academy of Sciences. Along with pathologist Paul Clemens von Baumgarten, the eponymous Baumgarten–Tangl law is named after him.

== Early academic career ==
Tangl was born the son of a cloth-maker in Budapest in 1866. He attended the University of Budapest and graduated with a degree in medicine. He next was provided with a one-year traineeship for general hospitals and medical institutions, and spent half a year in 1887 in Kiel, dealing primarily with histology. On 1 April that year he received a post as an assistant in histology in the medical school's embryology division at Graz. Eventually he received the Schordann Zsigmond scholarship to study abroad, the study of bacteriology as an assistant to Paul Clemens von Baumgarten at the University of Tübingen. At the same time, he worked as a doctor for a short period of time at the Krankenhaus am Urban hospital in Berlin while studying under Robert Koch and Ludwig. It was at this time he laid the foundations for the Baumgarten–Tangl law. University of Tübingen's Professor Walter Flemming offered him a position as a lecturer, but he returned home due to homesickness in 1891.

== Animal Physiology and Feeding Station ==
1896 he created the initiative for the Hungarian Royal Animal Physiology and Feeding Experimental Station of which he became the director. This is considered a breakthrough in technical science from 1901. The station started to function in the end of 1896 in a small house built between the Institute of Pharmacology and the Institute of Pathology of the Veterinary Academy. There was an experimental stable downstairs, and two small laboratories, a balance-room, and an apartment on the first floor. This building was outgrown by the station in a few years, and in 1901 it was moved to a two-storied new building (now 4 Kitaibel Pál Street).

== Hungarian Academy of Science ==
In 1902, Tangl began as a correspondent to the Hungarian Academy of Science, and in 1910 became a regular professor there. This first year as a teacher, Michael Polányi was an assistant in his laboratory the Institute of Pathology and Physiological Chemistry. Tangl noticed his intelligence and got him a three-year scholarship, which furthered a turn toward research itself. Tangl's insistence that physiology be based on sound knowledge of physical chemistry furthered Polanyi's interest in that area.

1903–1914, Tangl was appointed ordinarius in charge of medical chemistry at University of Budapest Chemistry Department following the death of the predecessor, Plósz Béla.

From 1914 to 1917, he was regular professor of physiology at Budapest University. While there, he contributed significant research into the study of the development, bird embryo, energy and the metabolism of insects during metamorphosis. He was a founder of the college of veterinary medicine, Department of Physiology and Biochemistry, and Anatomy and Histology. From 1915, chemist Irén Götz worked for him as an unpaid assistant chemist on her return from a year researching at Marie Curie's Radium Institute.

On 19 December 1917, amidst troubles within Budapest due to the 1st World War, he continued his work, but later that afternoon, while he was going to go back home, he was shot by a stray bullet and he died on the spot, several metres outside his workplace. He was buried on 22 December 1917 in the Kerepesi Cemetery. His body was exhumed in 1954 and moved to the Farkasréti cemetery.

== Recognitions ==
- He was the Hungarian Natural History Society's vice-president of Special Physiology (1901–1903) and president twice (1907–1912, 1914–1916).
- In 1912 he received recognition of his work from the King's court, the title of councilor.

A tablet was placed on the wall of the Department of Surgery and Ophthalmology, University of Veterinary Science on 28 May 1996, on the occasion of the centenary of the establishment of the Hungarian Royal Animal Physiology and Feeding Experimental Station with the participation of László Fésüs, director general, László V. Frenyó, rector.

== Family ==
- His brother Tangl Károly was a physicist who studied under Loránd Eötvös.
- He was survived by his son Tangl Harand, a physiologist and doctor.

== Sources ==
All in Hungarian.

- http://mek.oszk.hu/00300/00355/html/ABC15363/15457.htm
- http://konyvtar.univet.hu/portre/fotocd/tangl.htm
- http://www.kfki.hu/physics/historia/historia/egyen.php?namenev=tanglf&nev5=Tangl+Ferenc
- https://web.archive.org/web/20160304001653/http://orvostortenet.hu/tankonyvek/tk-05/pdf_Szallasi/vegyes_048.pdf
