= Forest of Fontainebleau (painting) =

Painting by Jean-Baptiste-Camille Corot

- Artist: Jean-Baptiste-Camille Corot
- Year: 1834
- Type: Oil on canvas, Landscape painting
- Dimensions: 175.6 cm × 242.6 cm (69.1 in × 95.5 in)
- Location: National Gallery of Art, Washington D.C.

Forest of Fontainebleau (French: Forêt de Fontainebleau) is an 1834 landscape painting by the French artist Jean-Baptiste-Camille Corot. It depicts the Forest of Fontainebleau near Fontainebleau.

Corot exhibited the painting at the Salon of 1834 at the Louvre in Paris. It is sometimes confused with another view of Fontainebleau which was exhibited at the Salon of 1831. Today it is in the collection of the National Gallery of Art in Washington.

== Bibliography ==
- Eitner, Lorenz. French Paintings of the Nineteenth Century: Before impressionism. National Gallery of Art, 2000.
- Mabey, Richard. Beechcombings: The Narratives of Trees. Random House, 2008.
