= Baumgarten–Tangl law =

Rule about Tuberculosis

The Baumgarten–Tangl law is a rule about tuberculosis: it states that the location where the bacteria intruded is the one where the inflammation can be observed first.

The law was first published in 1890 by Franz Tangl and verified in 1905 by Paul Clemens von Baumgarten.
