= Portrait of Madame Jacques-Louis Leblanc =

Painting by Jean-Auguste-Dominique Ingres

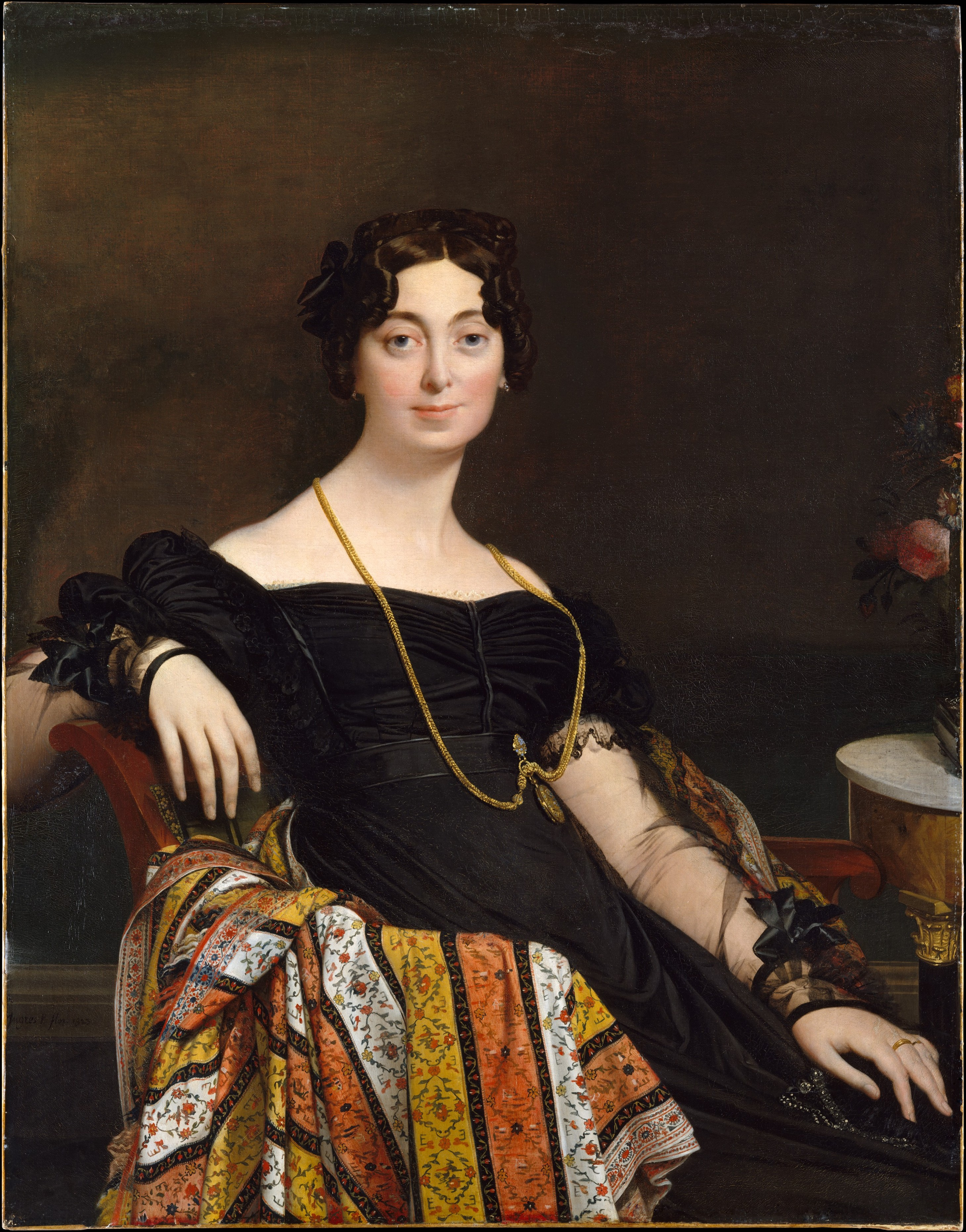
- Artist: Jean-Auguste-Dominique Ingres
- Year: 1823
- Medium: Oil on canvas
- Dimensions: 119.4 cm × 92.7 cm (47.0 in × 36.5 in)
- Location: Metropolitan Museum of Art, New York

The Portrait of Madame Jacques-Louis Leblanc is an oil painting by the French Neoclassical artist Jean-Auguste-Dominique Ingres, painted in 1823 and displayed at the Metropolitan Museum of Art in New York.

== Description ==
The painting portrays the wife of Jacques-Louis Leblanc, Françoise Poncelle, in 1823. It was painted by Jean-Auguste-Dominique Ingres after the couple met him in Florence. It depicts Leblanc in a proud posture, wearing a black dress and golden necklace, indicating her family's wealth and her own self-assurance. Much of what is considered attractive about the painting is the way Poncelle's smile is depicted. Ingres used a darker color scheme to draw a bold contrast with the subject of the painting. For color balance with the dark background, he included a flower on a vase on the table next to Poncelle.

The Leblanc family owned the painting until purchased by close friends Edgar Degas and Albert Bartholomé, at which point it started circulating exhibitions in major cities including Paris, London, Moscow, New York, and Washington. It was also exhibited under original ownership in at the Salon of 1834 in Paris without its pendant by the same artist, Portrait of Jacques-Louis Leblanc.

Ingres's signature is visible at the lower left side of the painting. An oil painting on canvas, it is associated with the Neoclassicism style and sized 119.4 by 92.7 cm (47.0 by 36.5 in). In 1918 the painting was purchased from Degas's estate sale by the Metropolitan Museum of Art, who displays it on public exhibition.

== See also ==
- List of paintings by Jean-Auguste-Dominique Ingres
