= Batson venous plexus =

Details

Identifiers
- Latin: plexus Batsoni

The Batson venous plexus (Batson veins) is a network of valveless veins in the human body that connect the deep pelvic veins and thoracic veins (draining the inferior end of the urinary bladder, breast and prostate) to the internal vertebral venous plexuses. Because of their location and lack of valves, they are believed to provide a route for the spread of cancer metastases. These metastases commonly arise from cancer of the pelvic organs such as the rectum and prostate and may spread to the vertebral column or brain. The plexus is named after anatomist Oscar Vivian Batson, who first described it in 1940. Batson's plexus is part of the Cerebrospinal venous system.

Batson's venous plexus may also allow the spread of infection in a similar manner. neuroschistomiasis, Urinary tract infections like pyelonephritis have been shown to spread to cause osteomyelitis of the vertebrae via this route. The osteomyelitis in such a case will resolve concurrently with the same antibiotic that treats the urinary tract infection because both infections are from the same organism.
