= The Arab Tale-Teller =

Painting by Horace Vernet

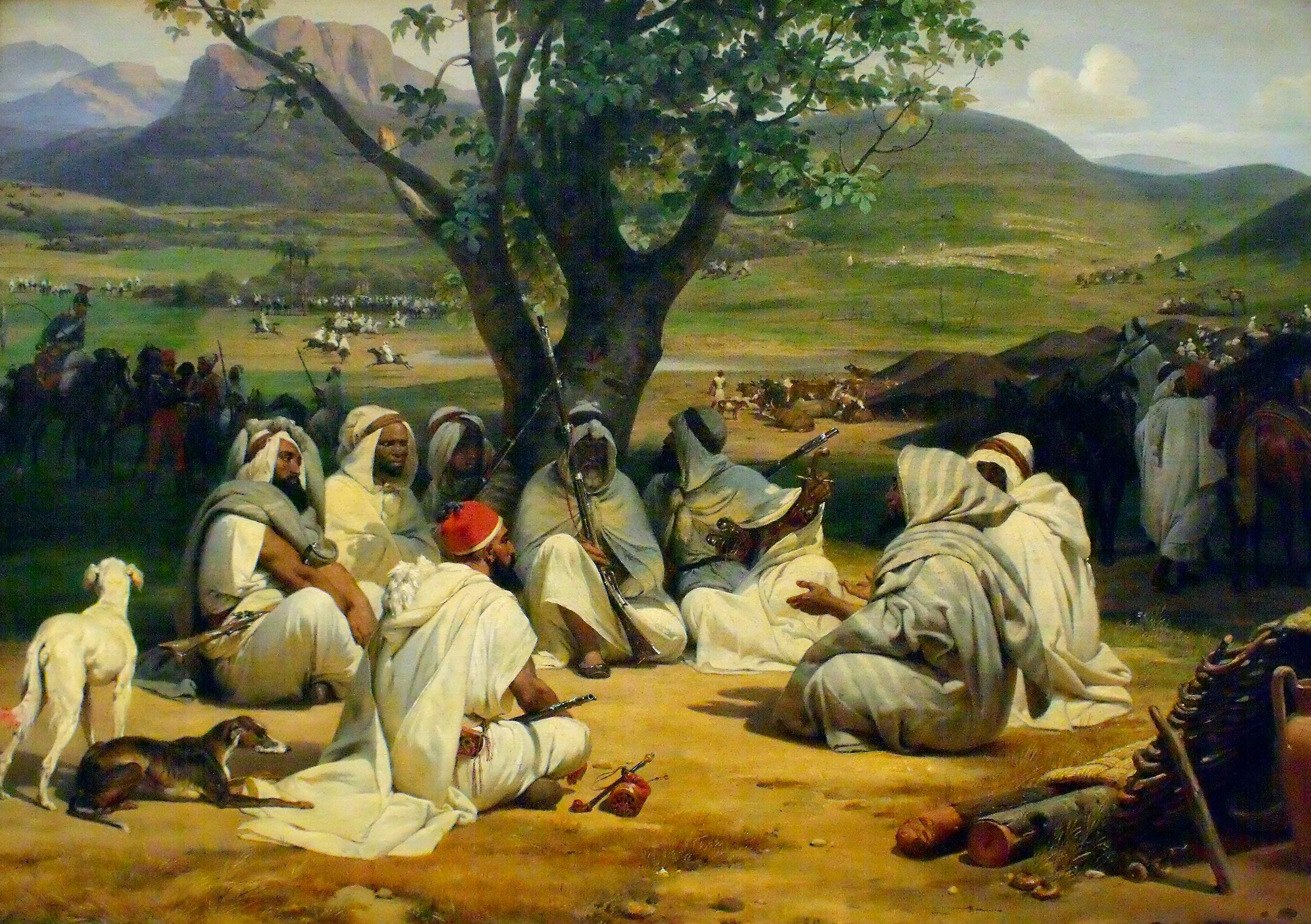
- Artist: Horace Vernet
- Year: 1833
- Type: Oil on canvas, genre painting
- Dimensions: 99 cm × 136.5 cm (39 in × 53.7 in)
- Location: Wallace Collection, London

The Arab Tale-Teller (French: Arabes écoutant un cois) an 1833 oil painting by the French artist Horace Vernet. An orientalist genre painting, it depicts a scene in an Arab encampment. Vernet travelled extensively during the French conquest of Algeria under the July Monarchy and it featured heavily in his work. The first major painting Vernet produced after his visit to Algeria, it is also known by the alternative title Arabs in Their Camp Listening to a Story.

The work was exhibited at the Salon of 1834 at the Louvre in Paris. Today the painting is in the Wallace Collection in London having been acquired by the Marquess of Hertford in 1847. A second version is in the Musée Condé in Chantilly.

== Bibliography ==
- Ingamells, John. The Wallace Collection: French Nineteenth Century. Trustees of the Wallace Collection, 1985.
- Harkett, Daniel & Hornstein, Katie (ed.) Horace Vernet and the Thresholds of Nineteenth-Century Visual Culture. Dartmouth College Press, 2017.
- Olmsted, Jennifer. Delacroix’s Moroccans Art and Masculinity. Penn State University Press, 2025.
