= Salon of 1834 =

1834 art exhibition in Paris

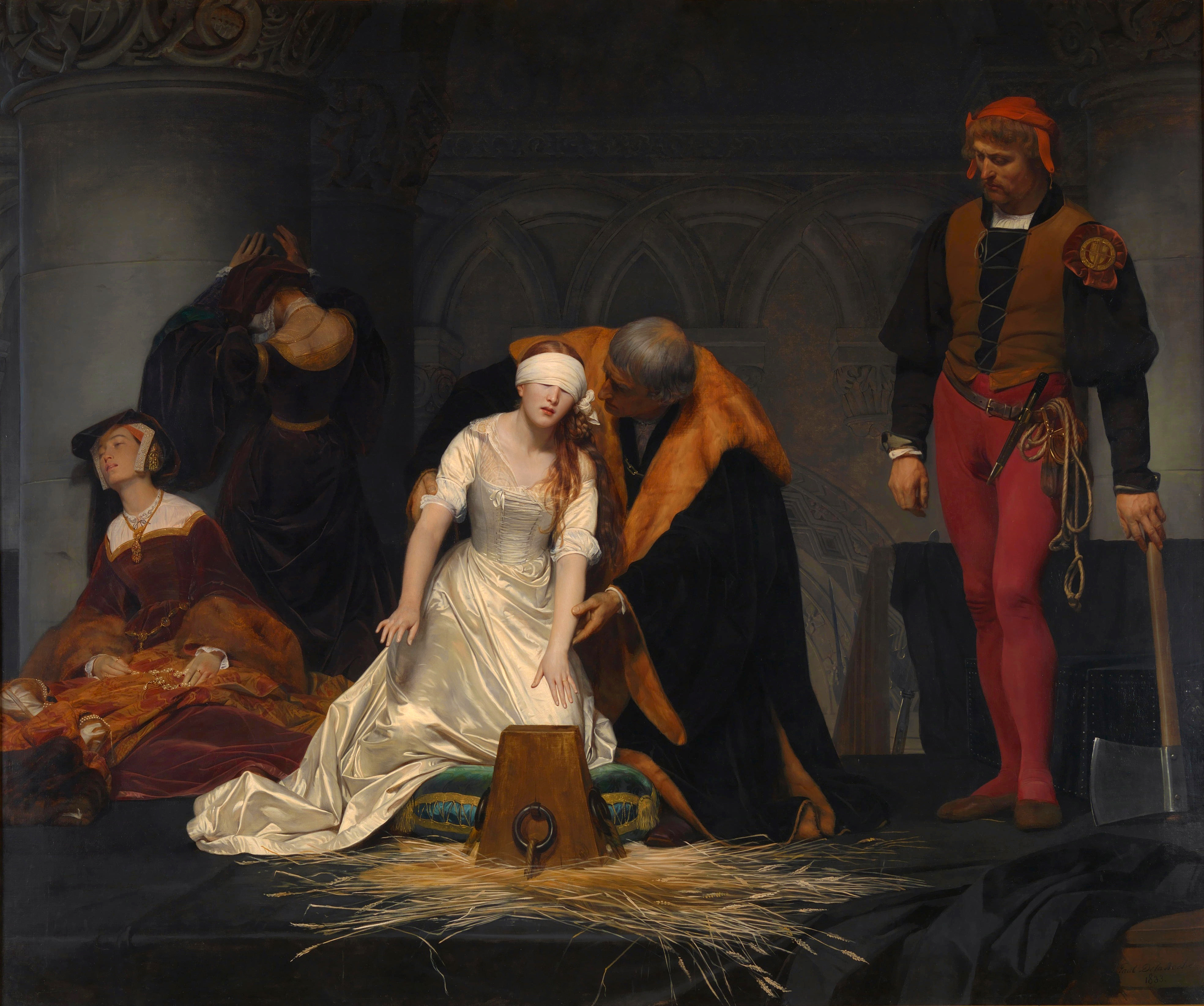
The Execution of Lady Jane Grey by Paul Delaroche

The Salon of 1834 was an art exhibition held at the Louvre in Paris, which opened on 6 March 1834. It marked a shift to annual exhibitions of the Paris Salon which had previously taken place every two or three years. It was held during the July Monarchy of Louis Philippe I. The paintings on display reflected patriotic themes of the constitutional monarchy and was followed by the Salon of 1835.

The Salon featured a number of Orientalist scenes inspired in part by the French Conquest of Algeria. This included Horace Vernet's Arab Chiefs in Council and Eugène Delacroix's Women of Algiers. Vernet's son-in-law Paul Delaroche continued his depictions of historical scenes with his The Execution of Lady Jane Grey.

Ernest Meissonier made his Salon debut with a genre painting Dutch Burghers. Ingres featured with his Portrait of Madame Jacques-Louis Leblanc which drew both praised and criticism. Notable sculptures on display included Satyre et bacchante by James Pradier. Antoine-Augustin Préault's plaster version of his sculpture Slaughter caused controversy for its depiction of the horrors of war and he did not exhibit at the Salon again during the reign of Louis Philippe.

== Gallery ==
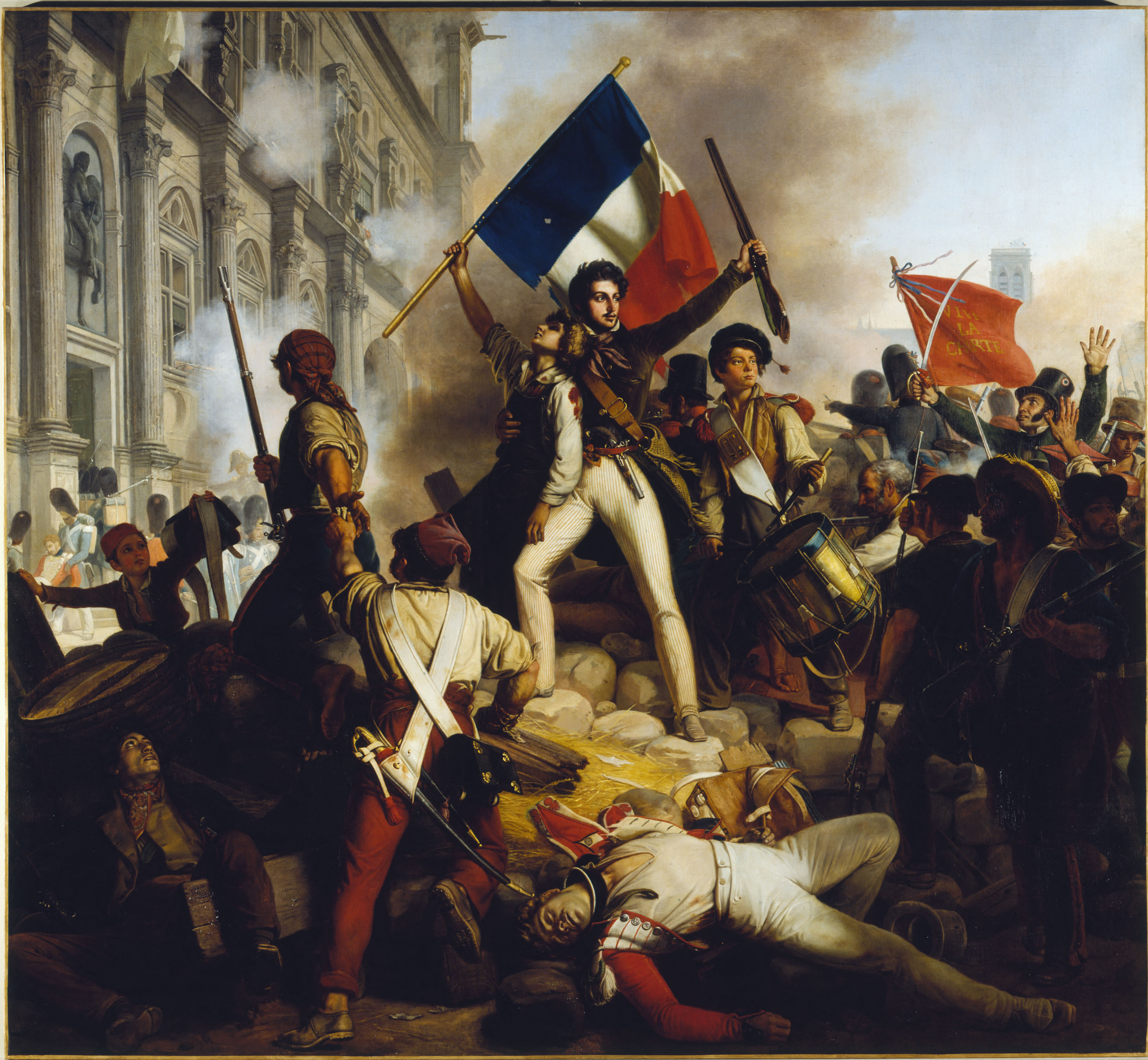
Fight in Front of the City Hall on 28 July 1830 by Jean-Victor Schnetz

Forest of Fontainebleau by Jean-Baptiste-Camille Corot

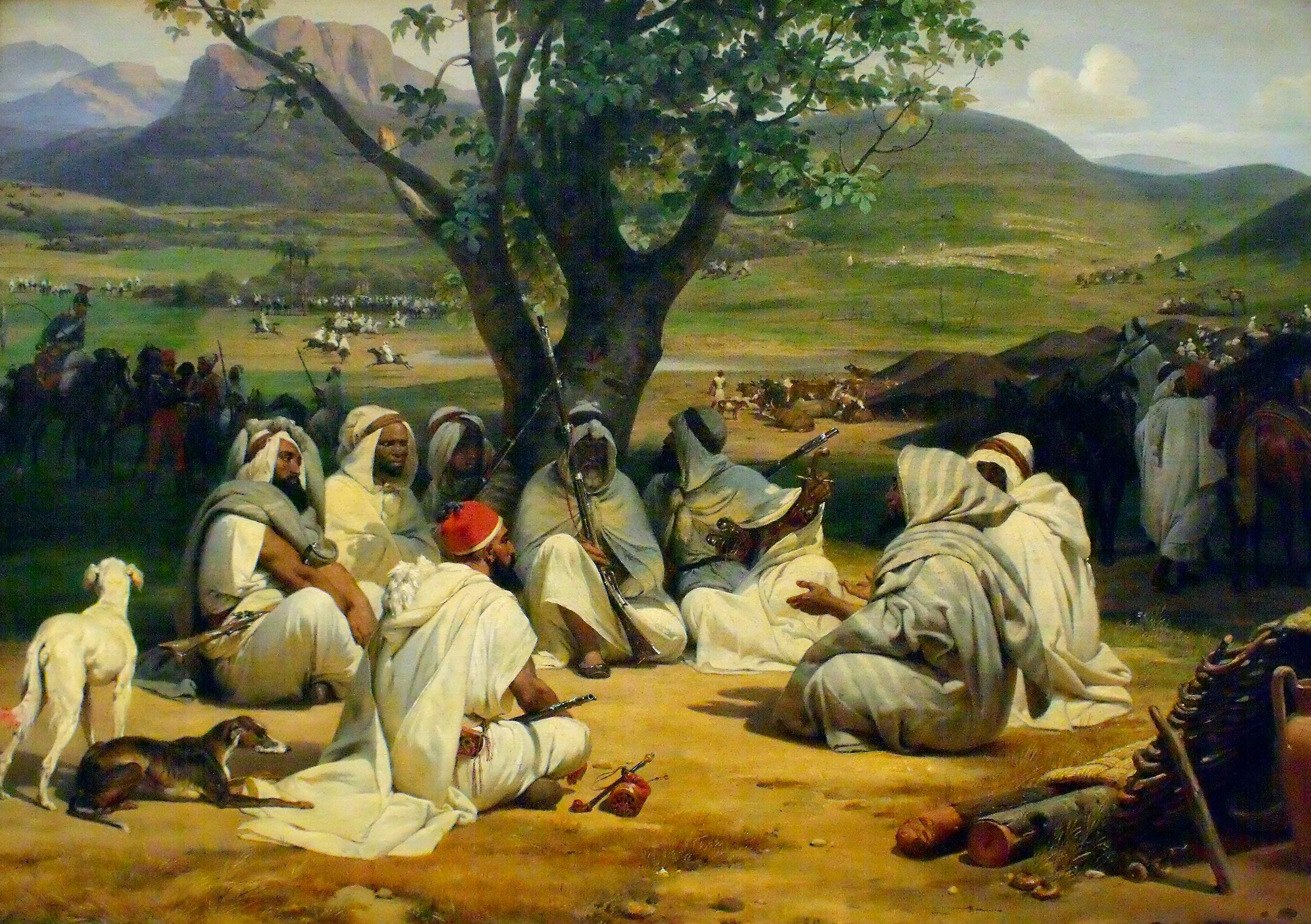
The Arab Tale-Teller by Horace Vernet

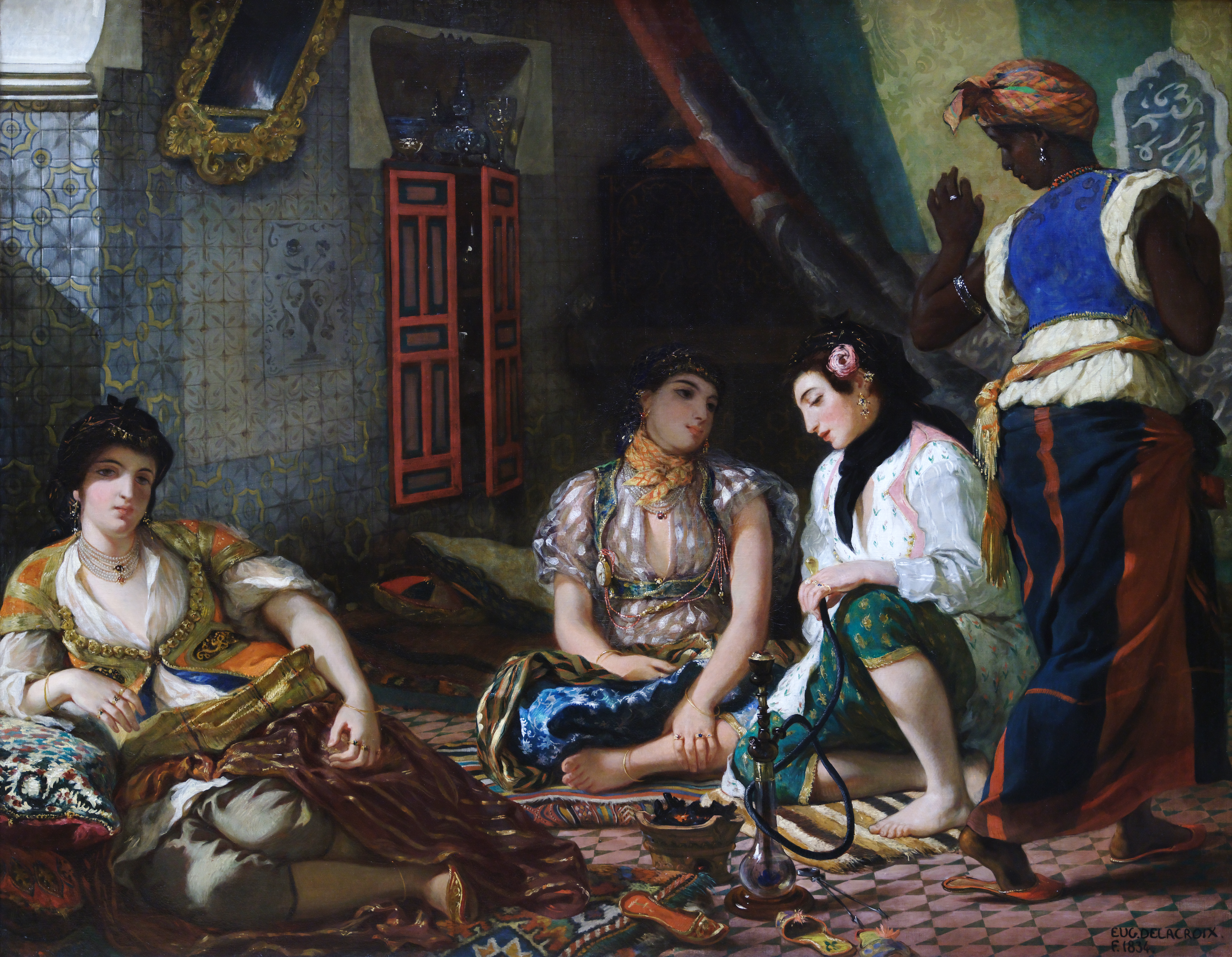
Women of Algiers by Eugène Delacroix

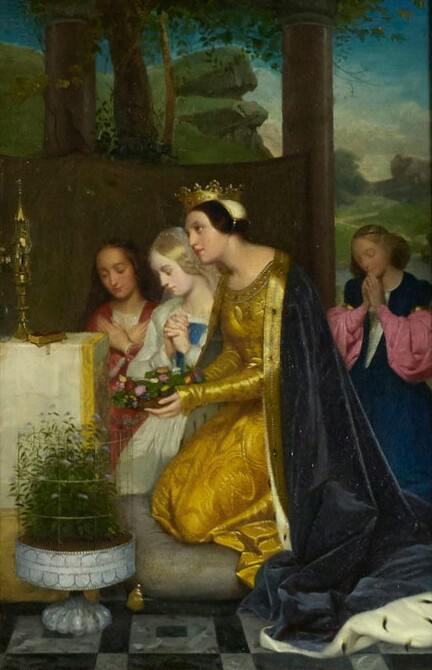
Saint Amelia, Queen of Hungary by Paul Delaroche

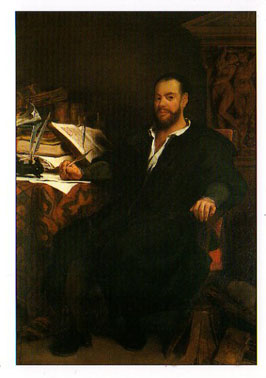
Rabelais by Eugène Delacroix

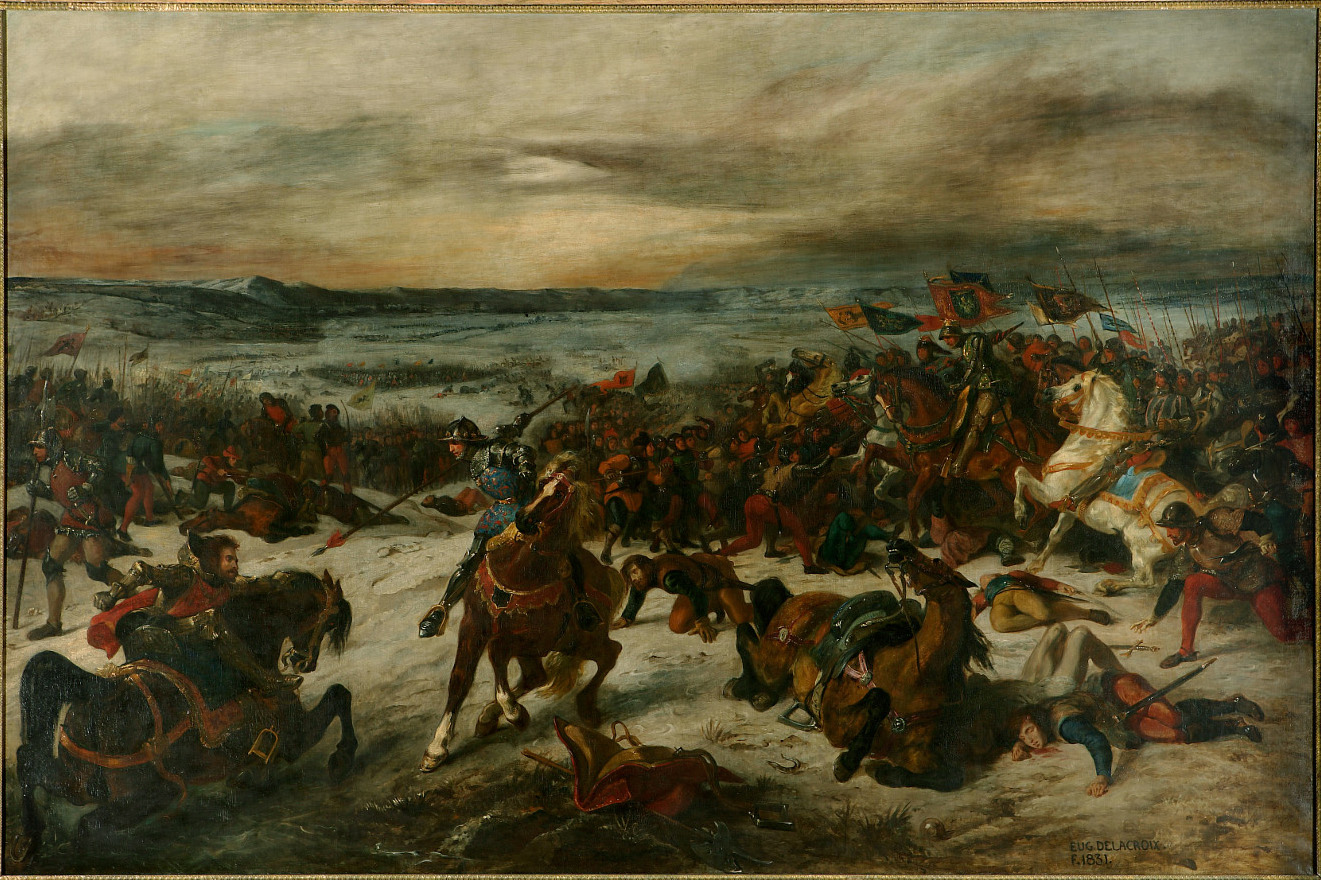
The Battle of Nancy by Eugène Delacroix

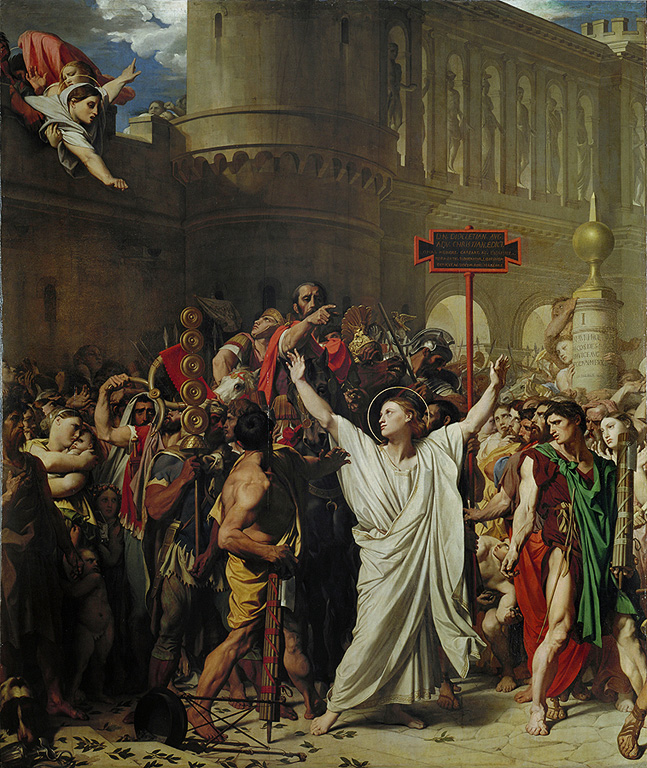
The Martyrdom of Saint Symphorian by Jean-Auguste-Dominique Ingres

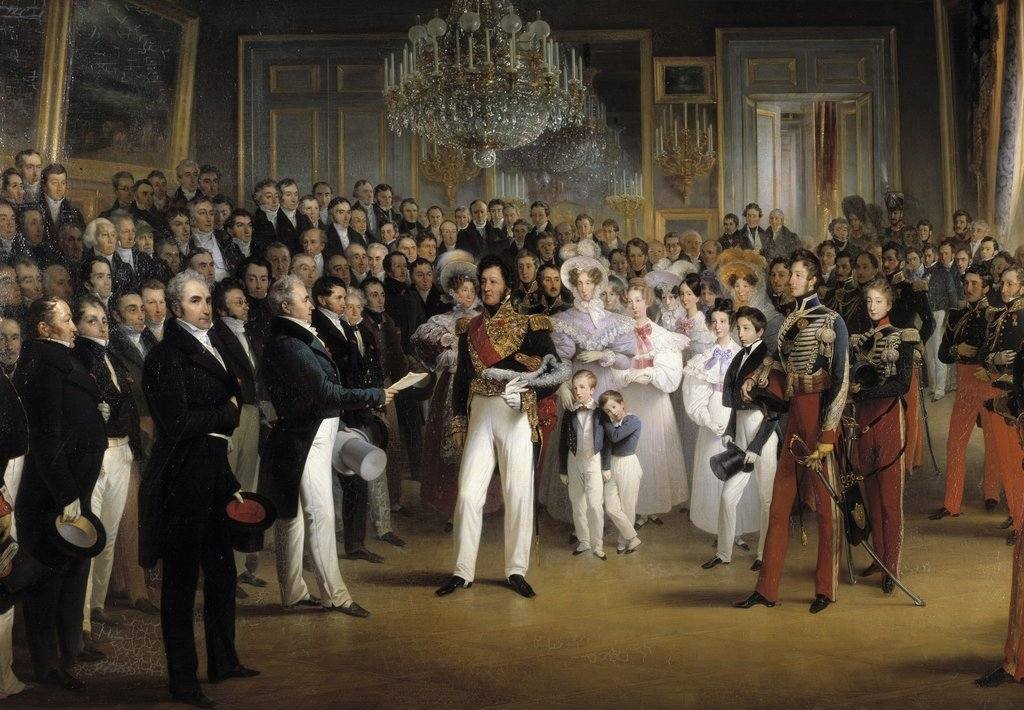
The Chamber of Deputies Received at the Palais-Royal by the Duke of Orleans by François Joseph Heim

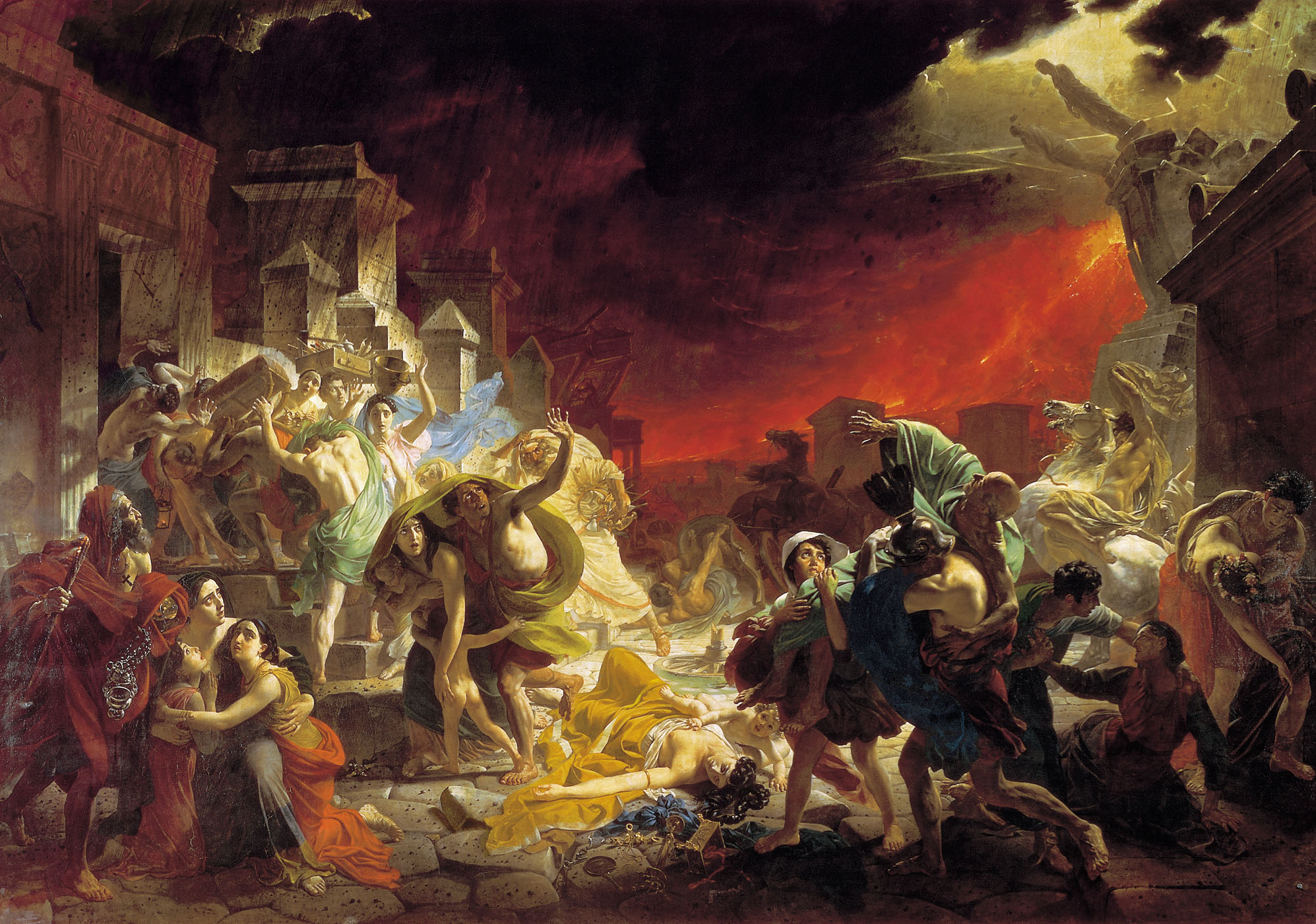
The Last Day of Pompeii by Karl Briullov

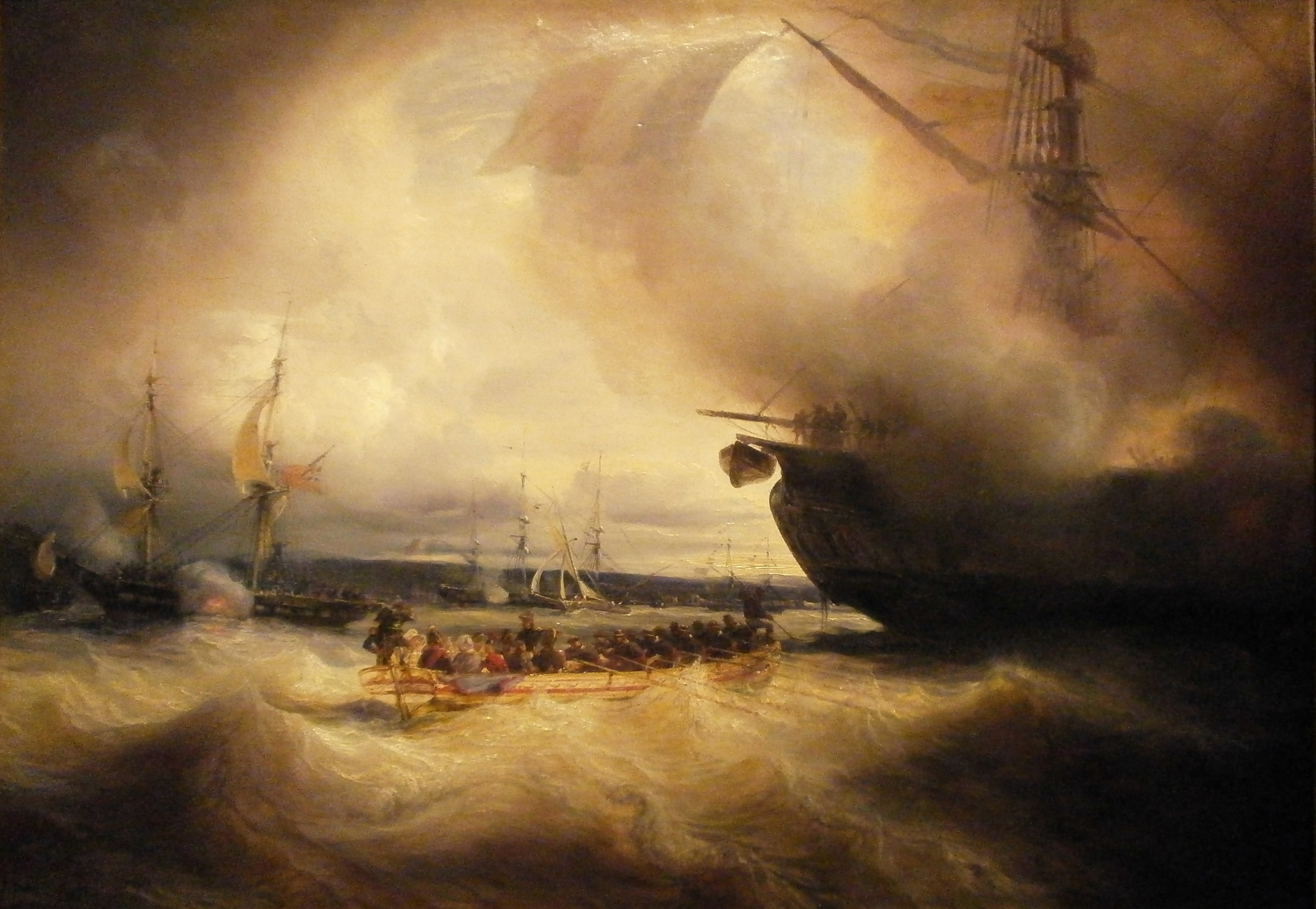
Louis-Philippe and His Family at the Harbour of Cherbourg by Théodore Gudin

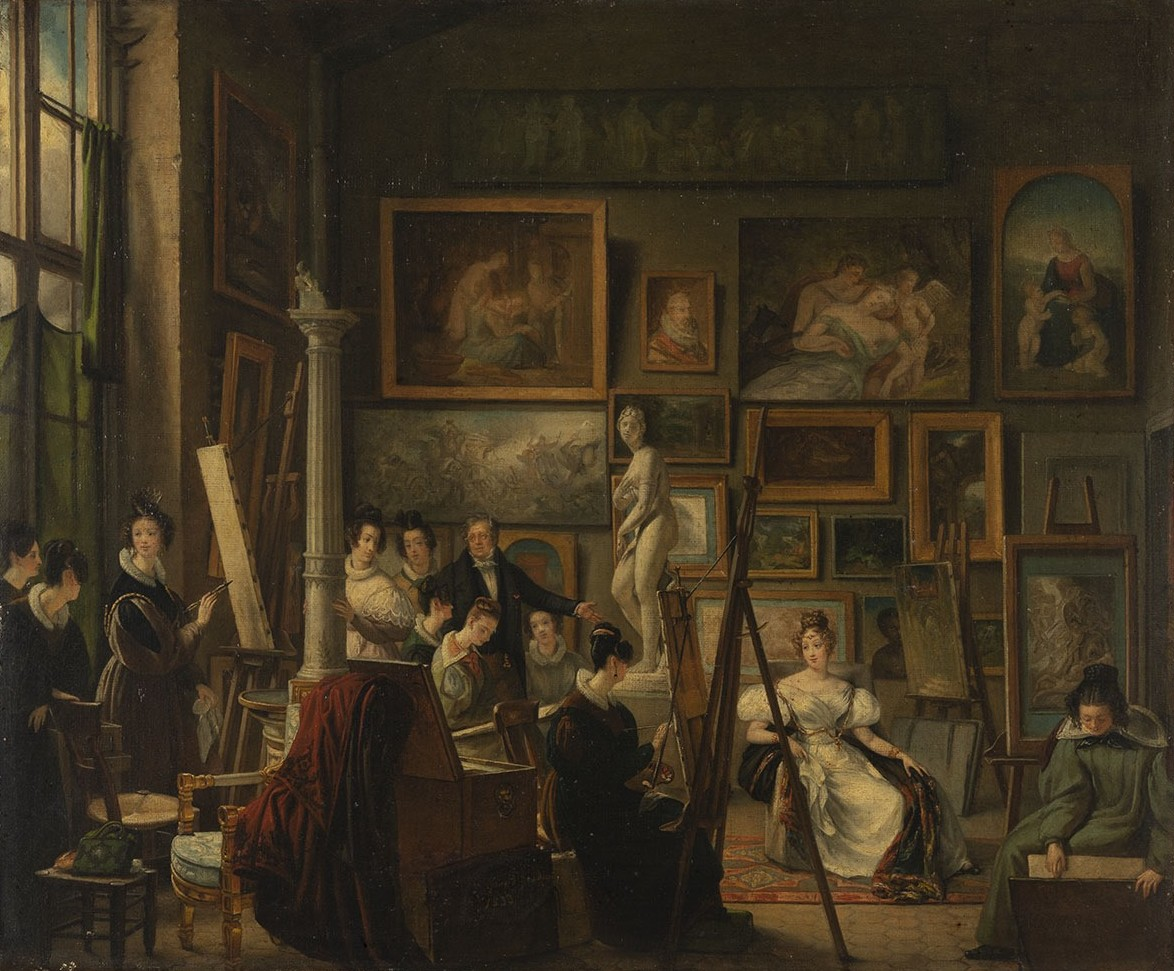
The Artist's Studio by Amélie Legrand de Saint-Aubin

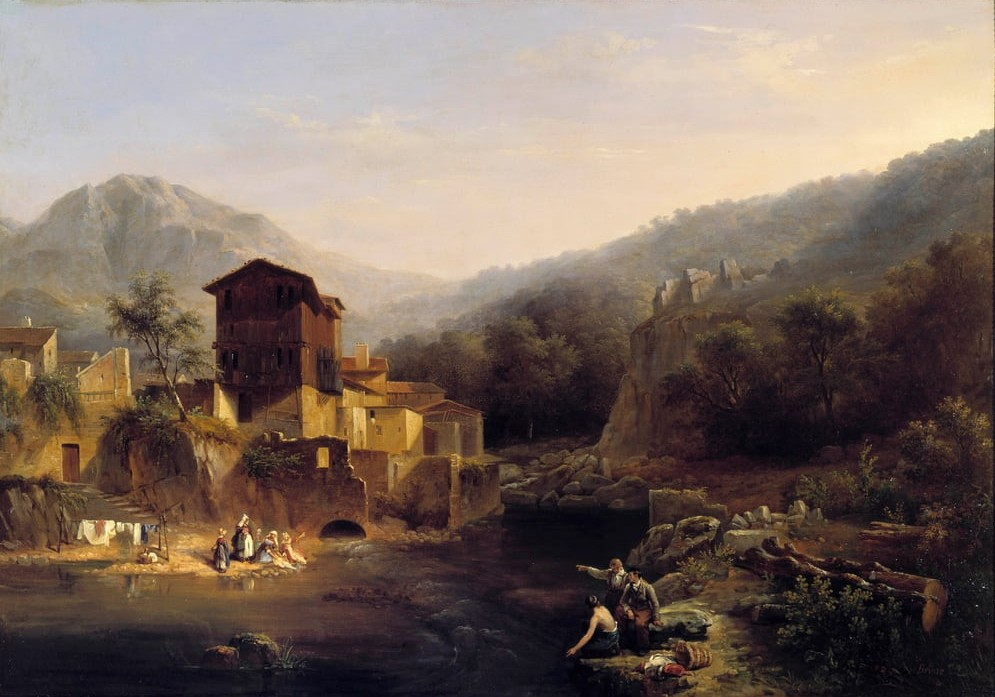
View of Thiers in Auvergne by Christian Brune

The Battle of Marengo by Jean Godefroy

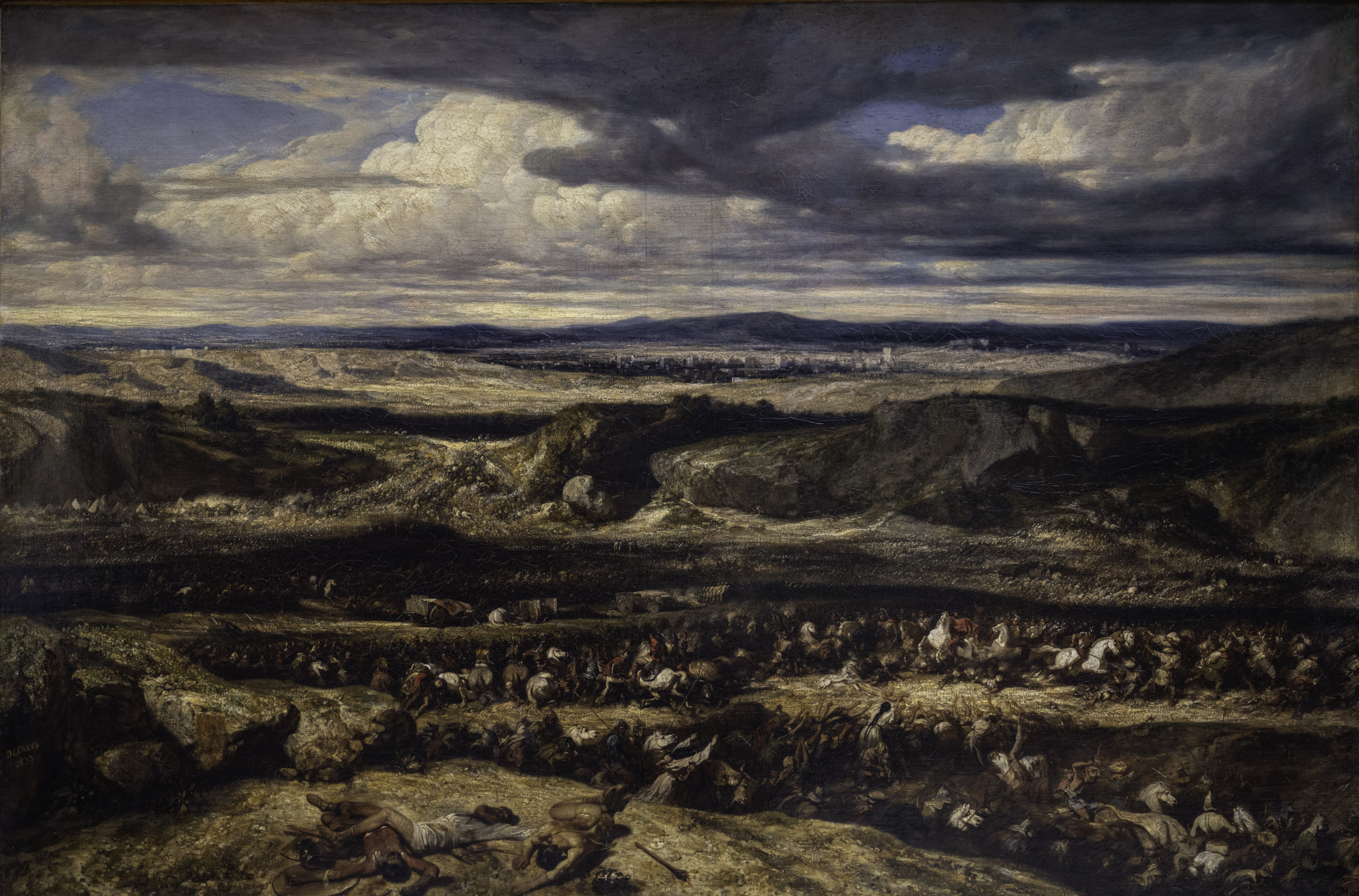
The Defeat of the Cimbri by Alexandre-Gabriel Decamps

Asses Resting: A Turkish Scene by Alexandre-Gabriel Decamps

A Turkish Guardhouse on the Road from Smyrna to Magnesia by Alexandre-Gabriel Decamps

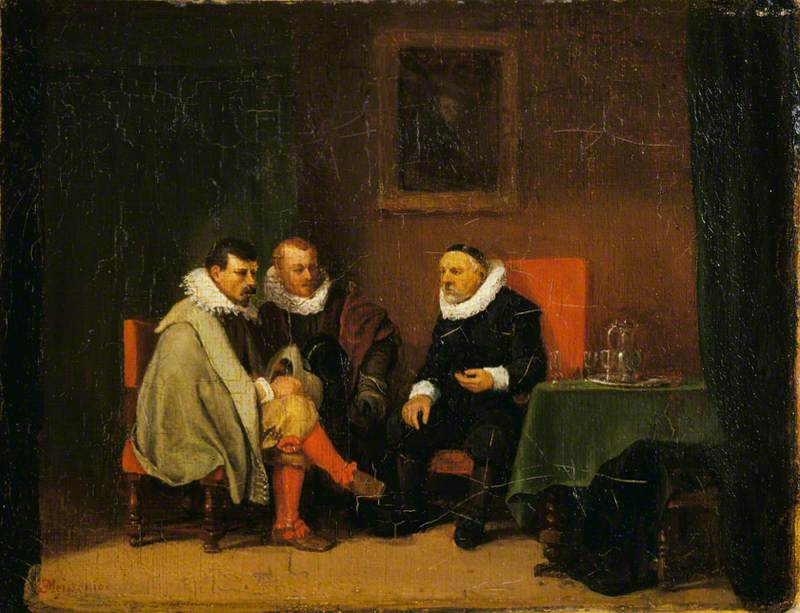
Dutch Burghers by Ernest Meissonier

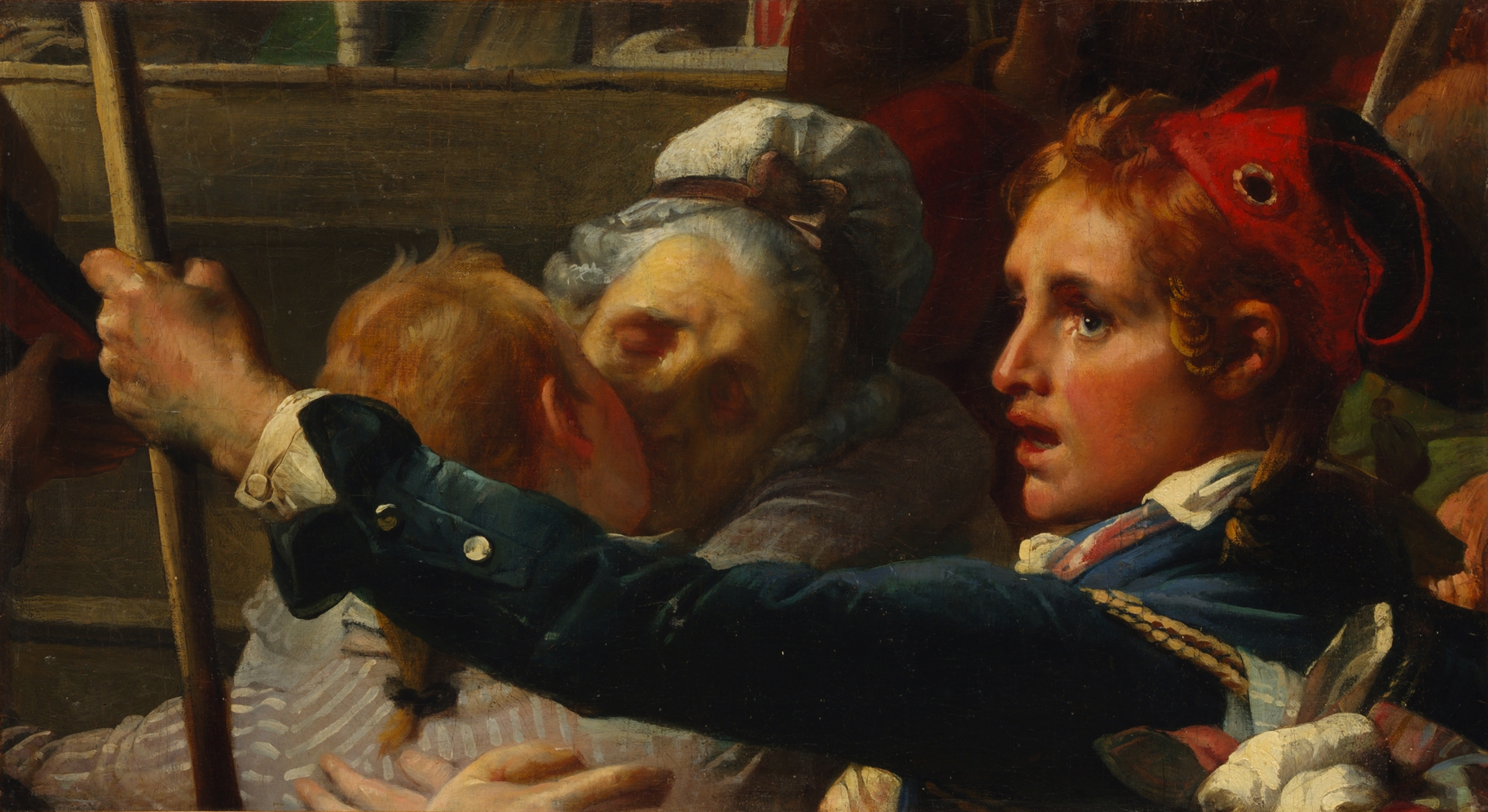
Fragment of a large painting (1832) exhibited at the Salons of 1833 and 1834, by Auguste-Hyacinthe Debay

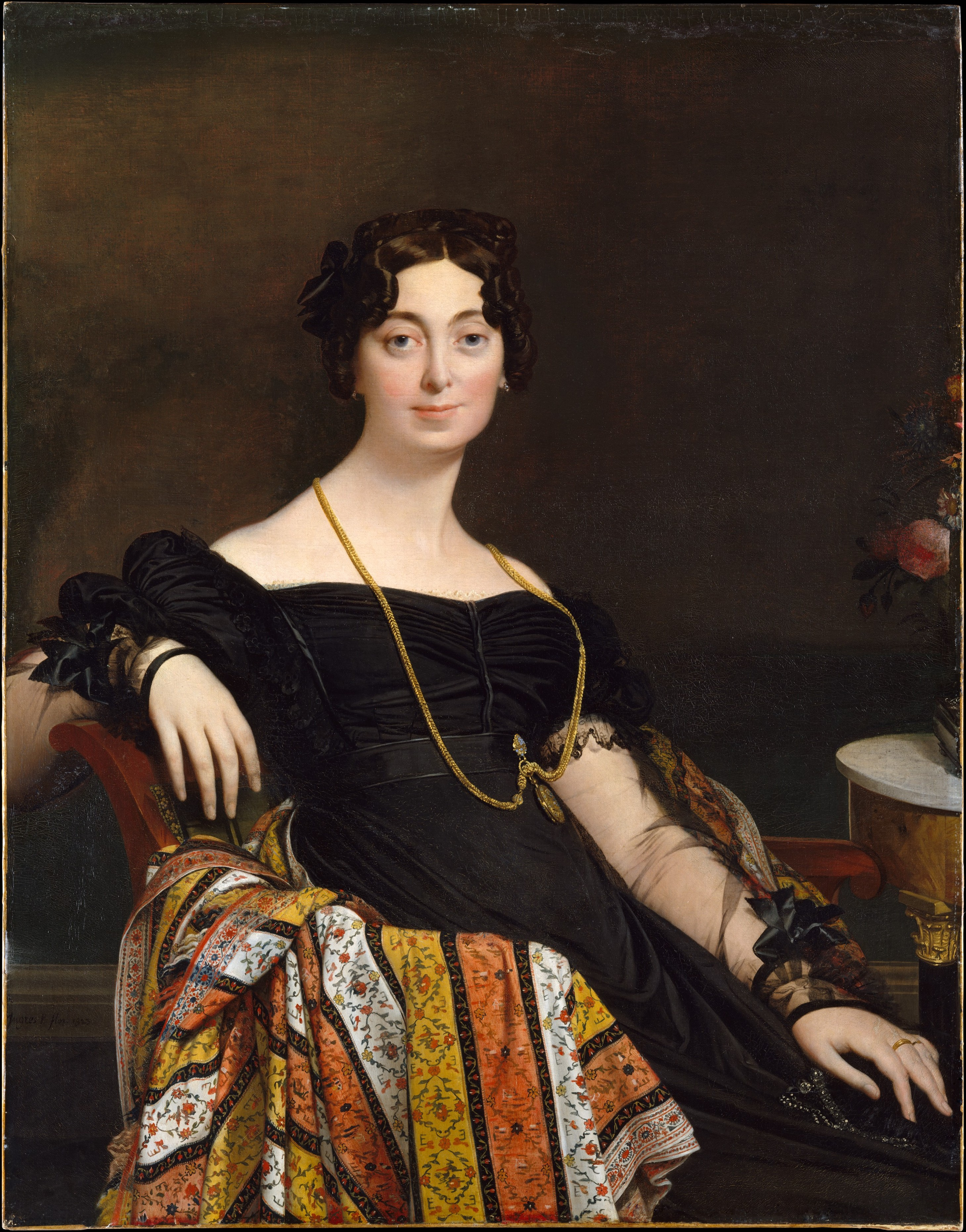
Portrait of Madame Jacques-Louis Leblanc by Jean-Auguste-Dominique Ingres

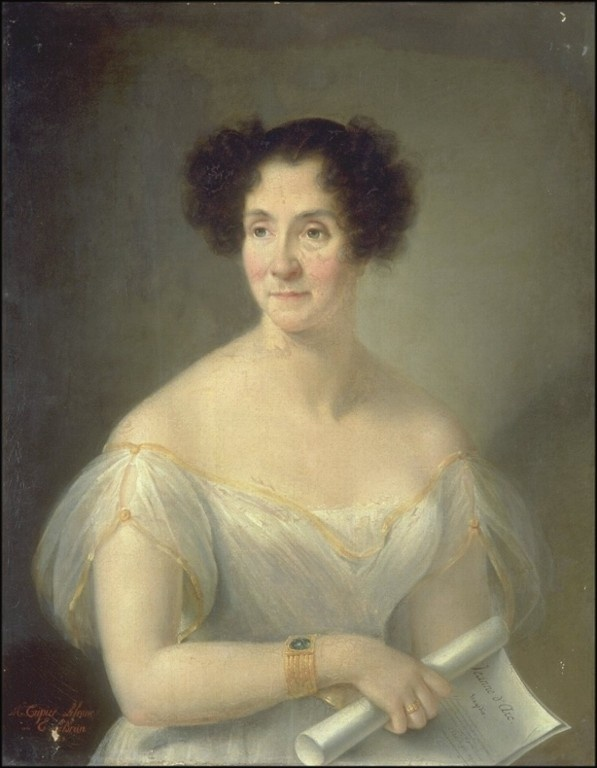
Portrait of Catherine Joséphine Raffin ("Mademoiselle Duchesnois") by Eugénie Tripier-Le Franc

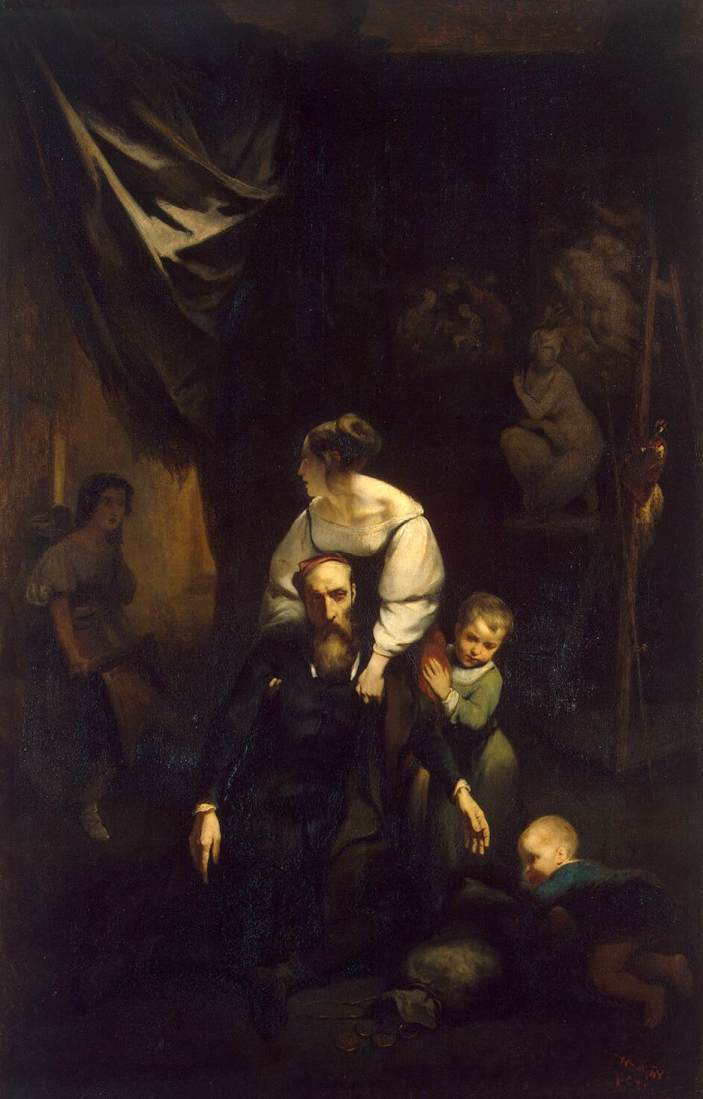
Death of Correggio by Octave Tassaert

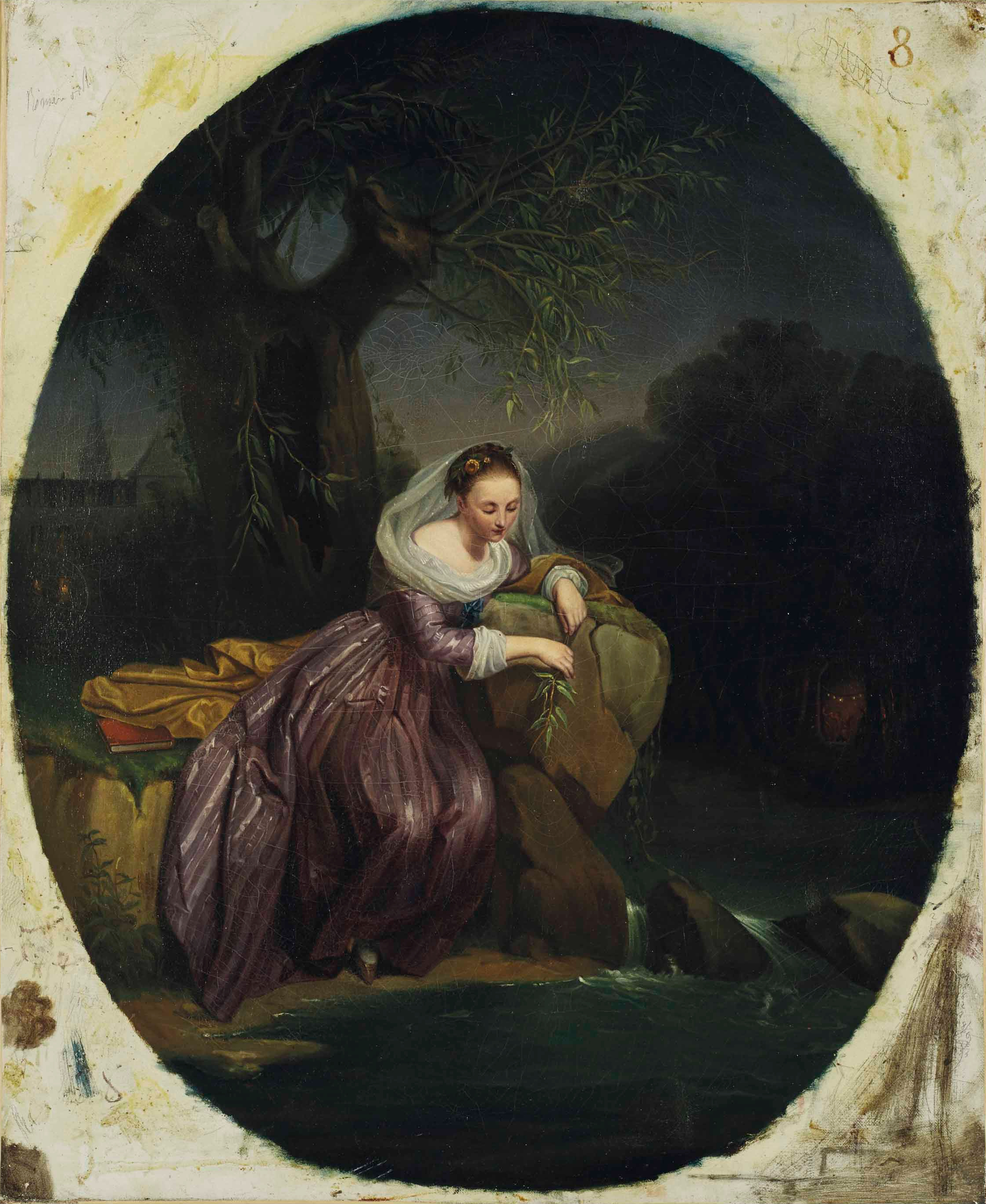
The Leafs of Willow by Jean-Augustin Franquelin

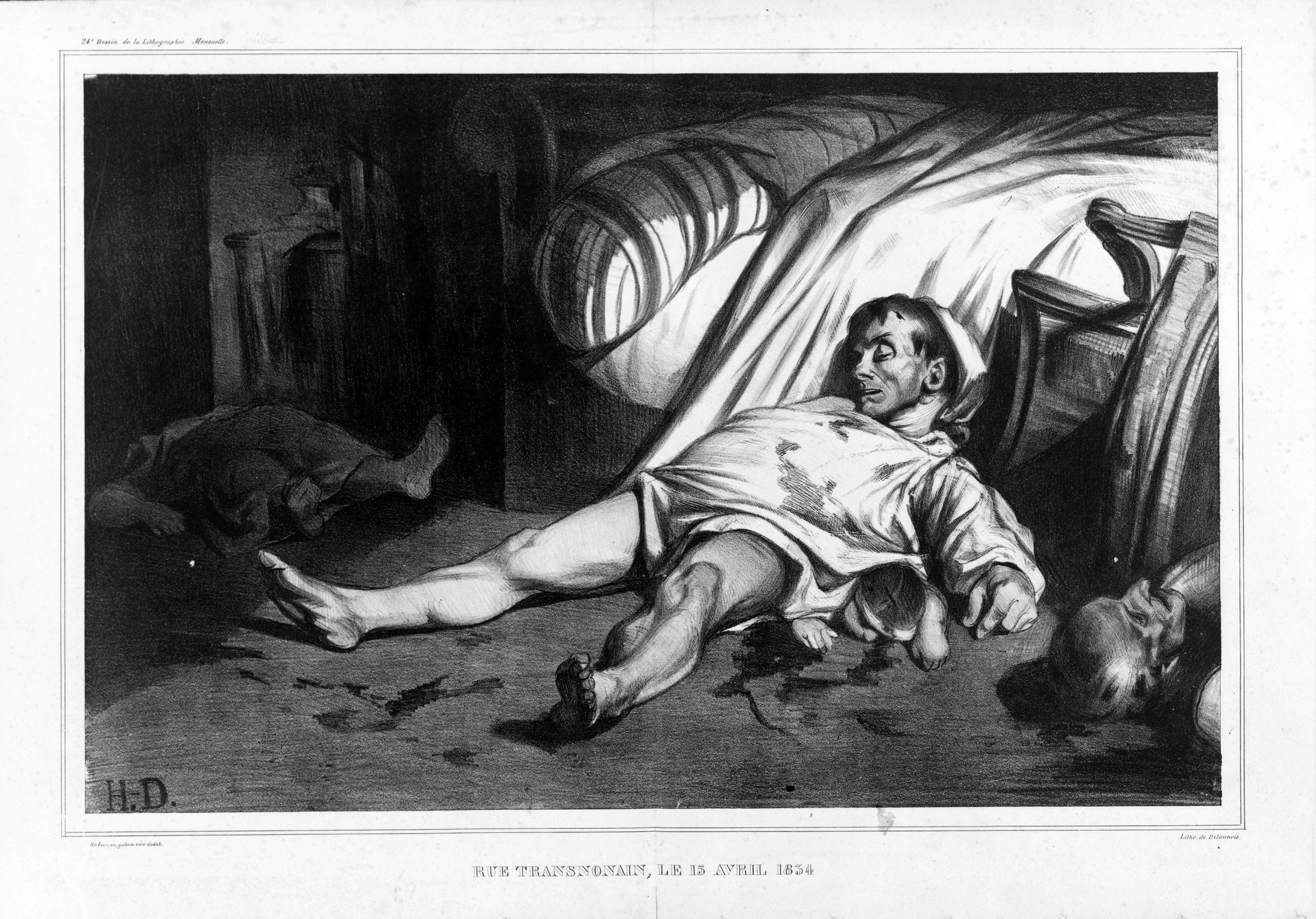
Rue Transonain (lithograph) by Honoré Daumier

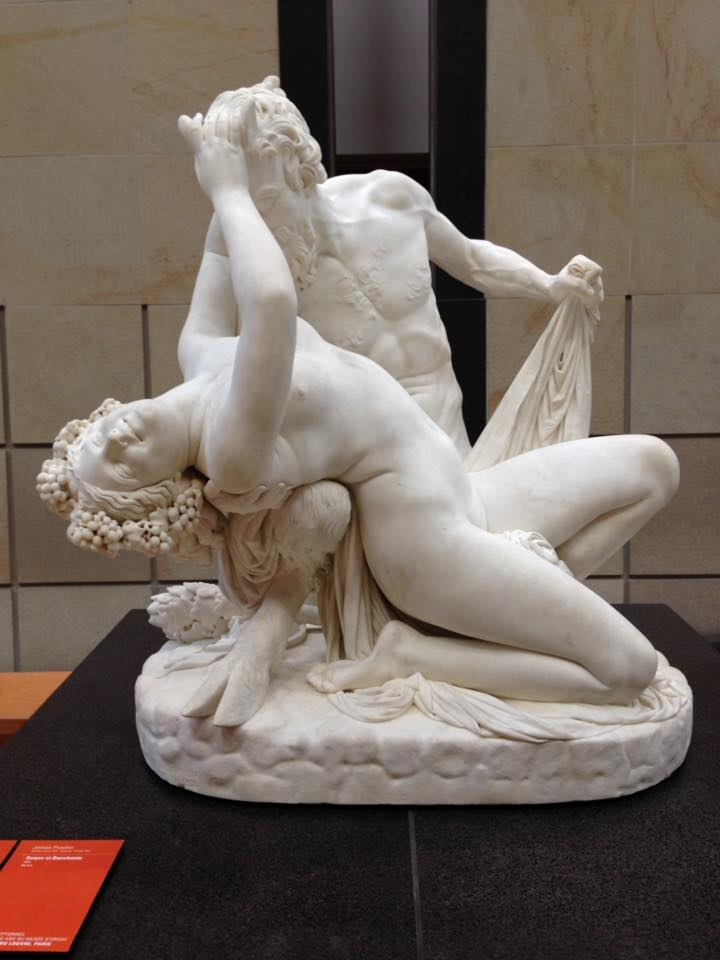
Satyre et bacchante by James Pradier

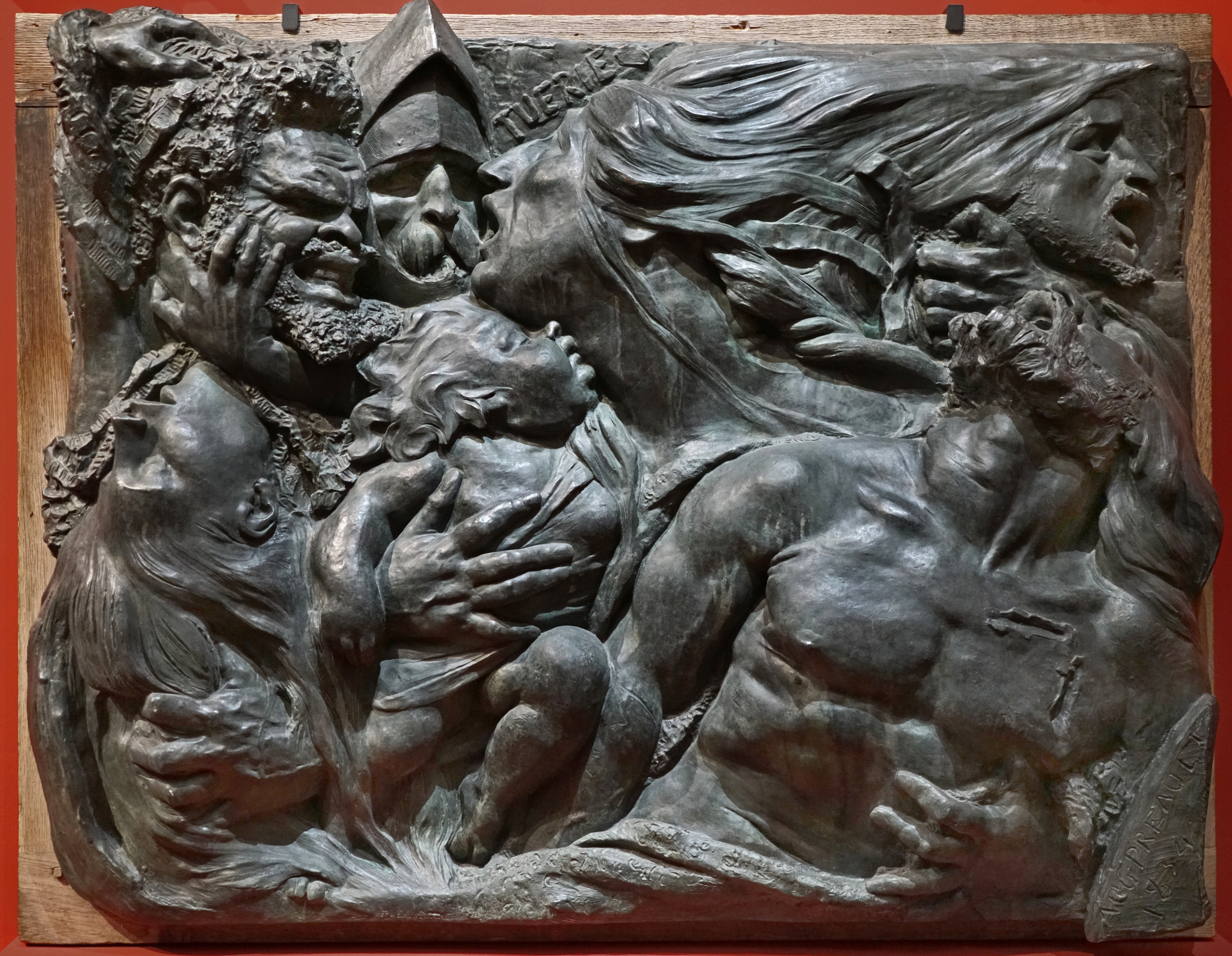
Slaughter by Antoine-Augustin Préault

Desk clock of the Archangel Saint-Michael, winner of Satan by Jean Bernard Duseigneur

== See also ==
- Royal Academy Exhibition of 1834, held at Somerset House in London

== Bibliography ==
- Barnes, Joanna & Marandel, Patrice J. French Oil Sketches and the Academic Tradition. American Federation of Art, 2009.
- Bätschmann, Oskar. The Art Public: A Short History. Reaction Books, 2023.
- Boime, Albert. Art in an Age of Counterrevolution, 1815-1848. University of Chicago Press, 2004.
- Facos, Michelle. An Introduction to Nineteenth-Century Art. Taylor & Francis, 2011.
- Harkett, Daniel & Hornstein, Katie (ed.) Horace Vernet and the Thresholds of Nineteenth-Century Visual Culture. Dartmouth College Press, 2017.
- Rosenthal, Leon. Romanticism. Parkstone International, 2014.
- Sterling, Charles & Salinger, Margaretta A. French Paintings: A Catalogue of the Collection of The Metropolitan Museum of Art. Vol. 2, Nineteenth Century. Metropolitan Museum of Art, 1966.
