= Paul Clemens von Baumgarten =

German pathologist

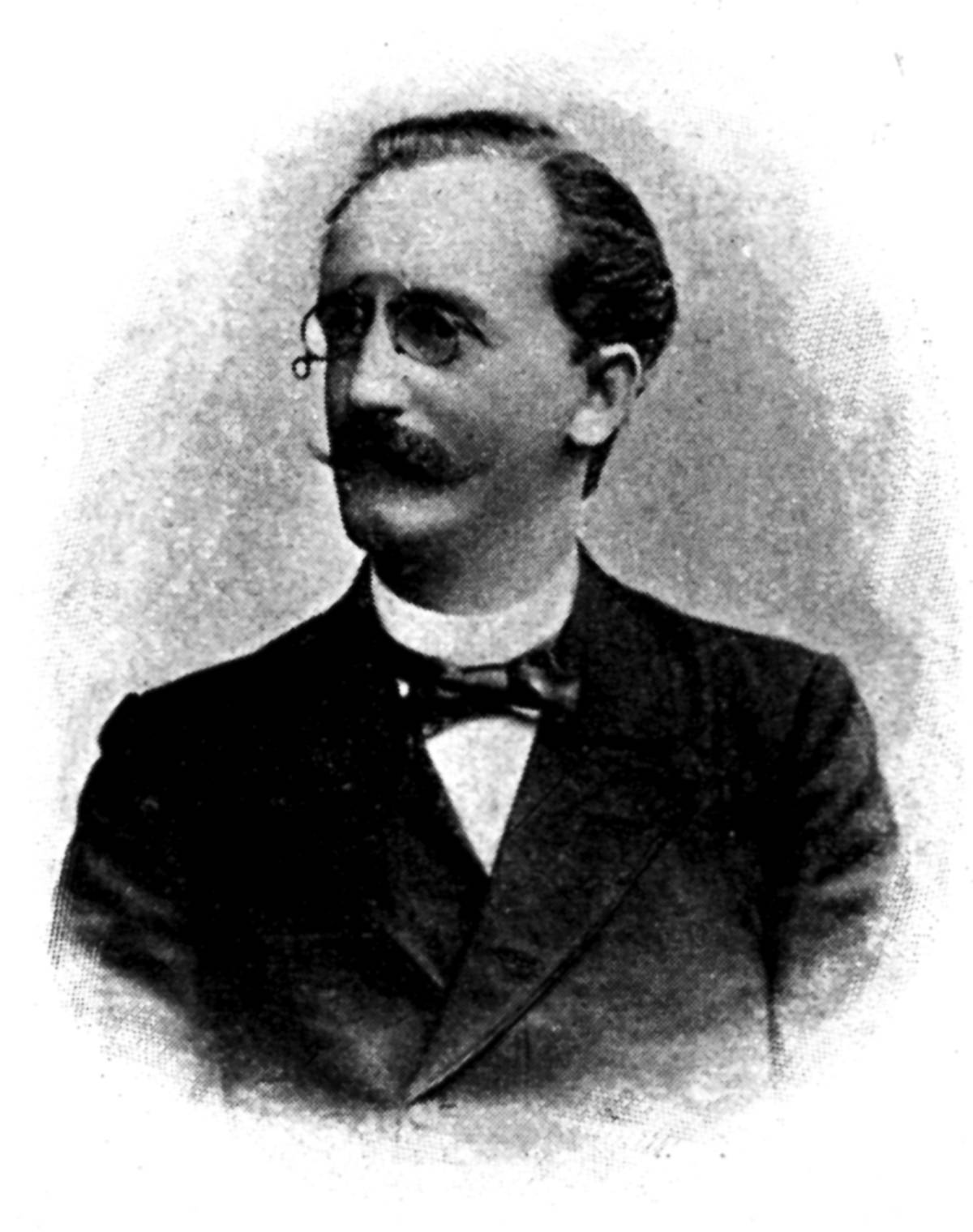
Paul Clemens von Baumgarten

Paul Clemens von Baumgarten (28 August 1848, in Dresden – 10 July 1928, in Tübingen) was a German pathologist.

== Biography ==
Paul Clemens was the son of a physician. He studied under Christian Wilhelm Braune (1831–1892) and Ernst Leberecht Wagner (1829–1888) at the University of Leipzig, and with Ernst Neumann (1834–1918) at the University of Königsberg. He obtained his medical doctorate at Leipzig in 1873, and later that year began work in the anatomical institute in Leipzig as an assistant to Braune and Wilhelm His, Sr. (1831–1904). From 1874 to 1879, he served as prosector at the pathological-anatomical institute in Königsberg. In 1877 he earned his habilitation, and several years later became an associate professor of pathological anatomy (1881). In 1889 he was appointed professor of pathological anatomy and general pathology at the University of Tübingen, where his studies also included work in the field of bacteriology.

In 1882 he described the tuberculosis bacillus, the same year as did Robert Koch. Based on numerous experiments, he disputed Ilya Ilyich Mechnikov's theory of phagocytes, and he decreed that neither Koch's new or old methods had any remedying effect on tubercles inoculated into rabbits or guinea pigs. His textbook of pathological mycology was a well-regarded, exhaustive study of bacteriology, in which its botanical, chemical, and pathological aspects are discussed in the form of lectures.

From 1885 to 1917, Baumgarten published the Jahresberichte über die Fortschritte in der Lehre von den pathogenen Organismen, and in 1889, began publication of Arbeiten auf dem Gebiete der pathogenen Anatomie und Bakteriologie (9 volumes).

== Selected works ==
- Entdeckung des spezifischen Tuberkelbazillus, 1882 - Description of the tuberculosis bacillus, Simultaneously with and independent of Robert Koch.
- Über Tuberkel und Tuberkulose, Berlin, 1885 - Here, Baumgarten clarifies the until then unsolved problem of the histogenesis of tuberculous processes.
- Zur Kritik der Metschnikoff'schen Phagocytentheorie, in: Zeitschrift für klinische Medizin, Berlin, XV, 1888 - Criticism of Mechnikov's "phagocyte theory".
- Lehrbuch der pathologischen Mykologie, Vorlesungen. two volumes. Braunschweig, 1888-1890; second edition, 1911 - Textbook of pathological mycology.

== Associated eponyms ==
- Baumgarten–Tangl law: A law regarding the localisation of tuberculosis; named with physiologist Franz Tangl.
- Cruveilhier–Baumgarten disease: Cirrhosis of the liver without ascites; named with pathologist Jean Cruveilhier. Was once referred to as "Baumgarten’s portal hypertension variant syndrome", Baumgarten published an account of this disease in a paper titled, Über vollständiges Offenbleiben der Vena umbilicalis; zugleich ein Beitrag zur Frage des Morbus Banti.

== See also ==
- Pathology
- List of pathologists
