= Gilbert Breschet =

French anatomist

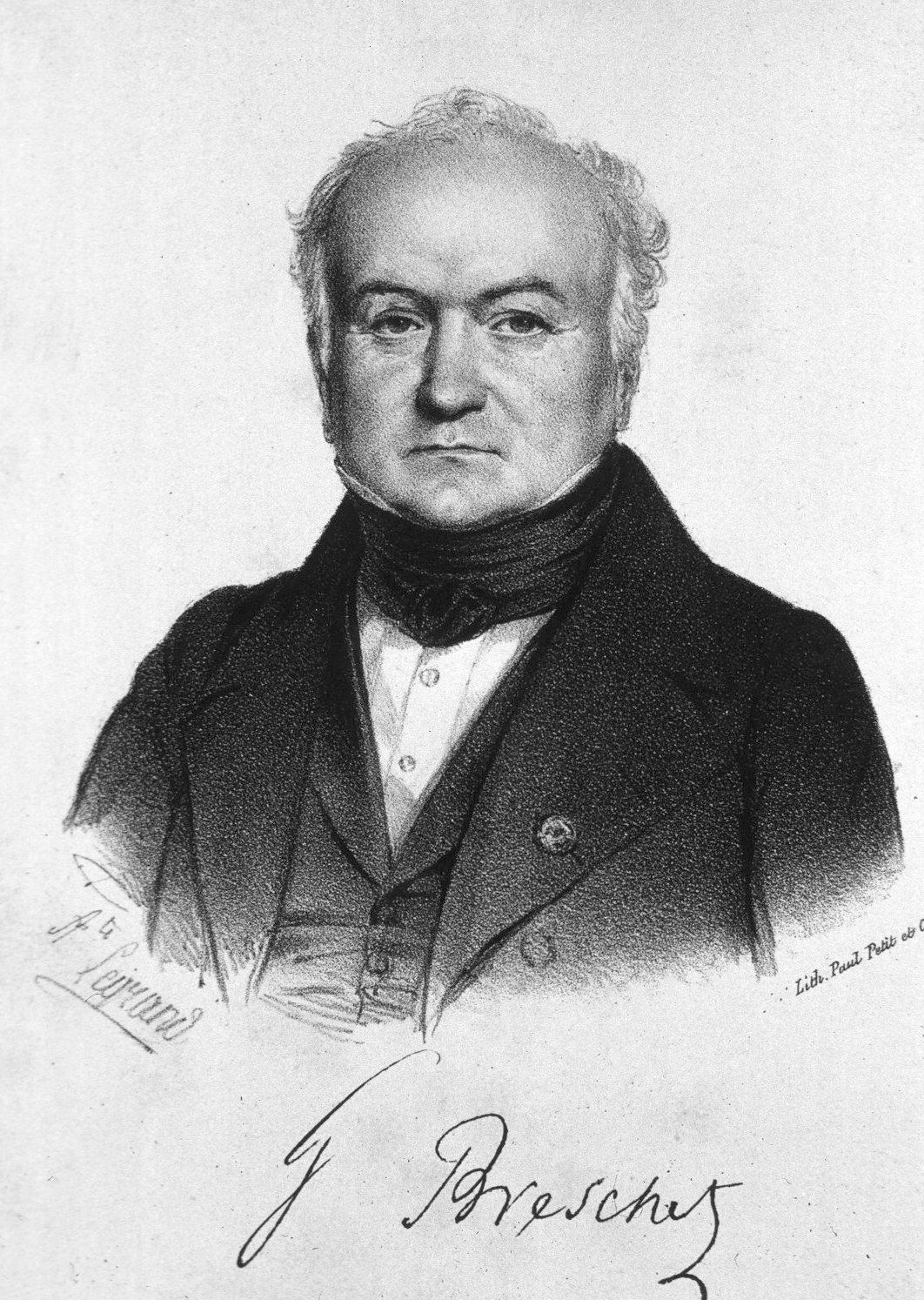
Gilbert Breschet.

Gilbert Breschet (7 July 1784 – 10 May 1845) was a French anatomist born in Clermont-Ferrand.

He studied medicine at the University of Paris and, in 1812, was conferred the degree of doctor of medicine in Paris. In 1836, he succeeded Jean Cruveilhier (1791–1874) as professor of anatomy at the Faculté de Médecine de Paris.

Osteological preparations by Breschet (Sorbonne University)

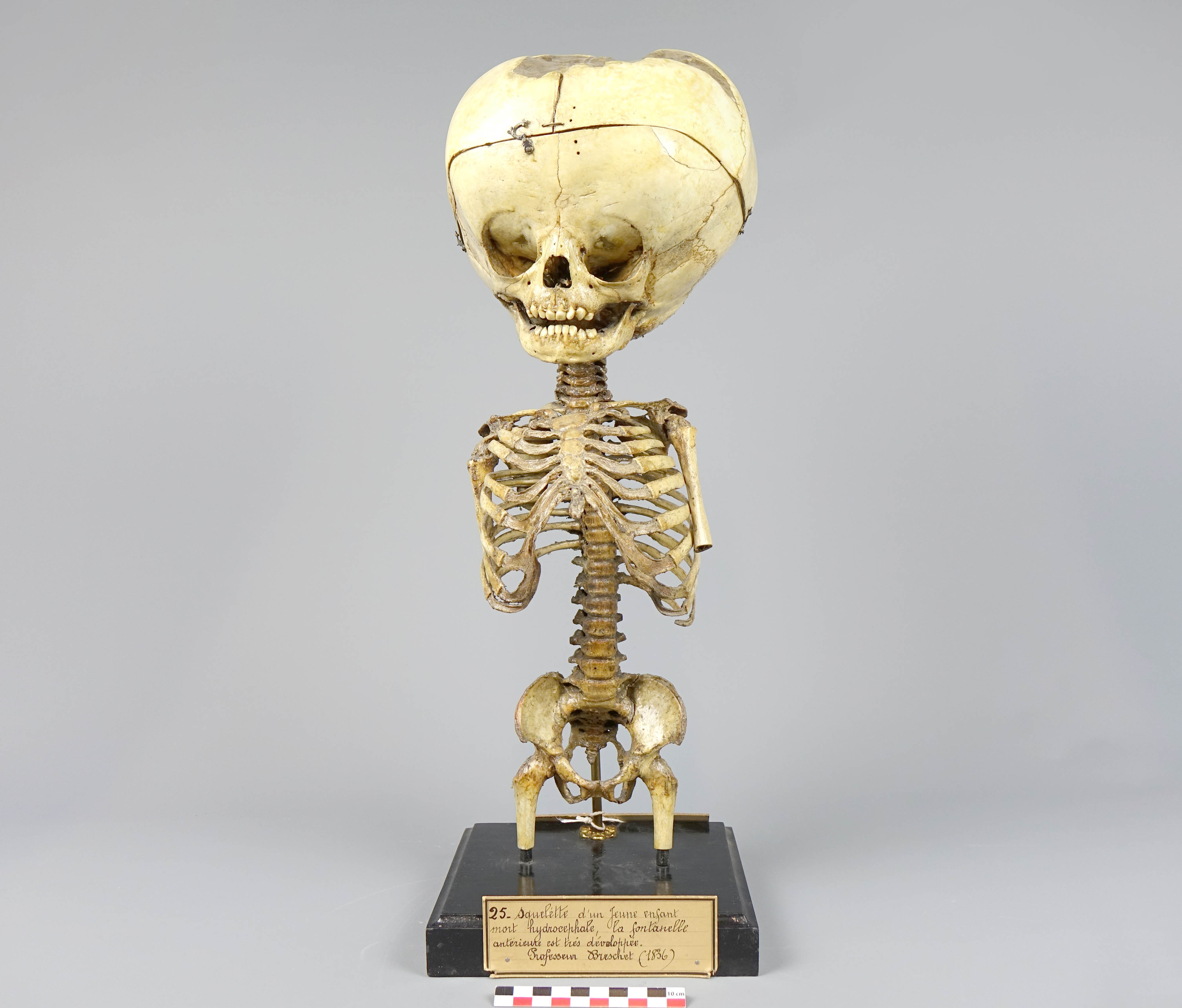
Hydrocephalus

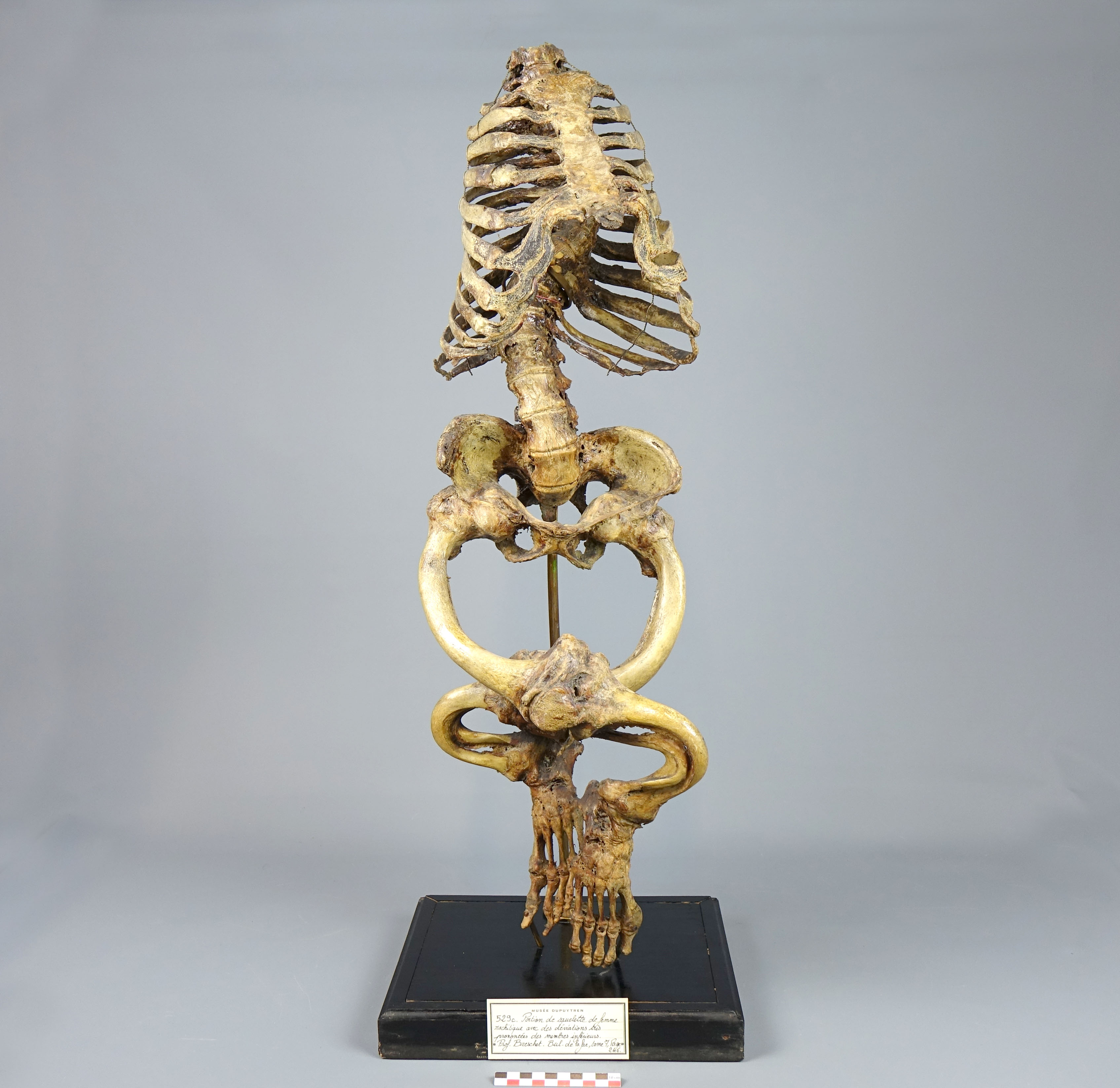
Rickets

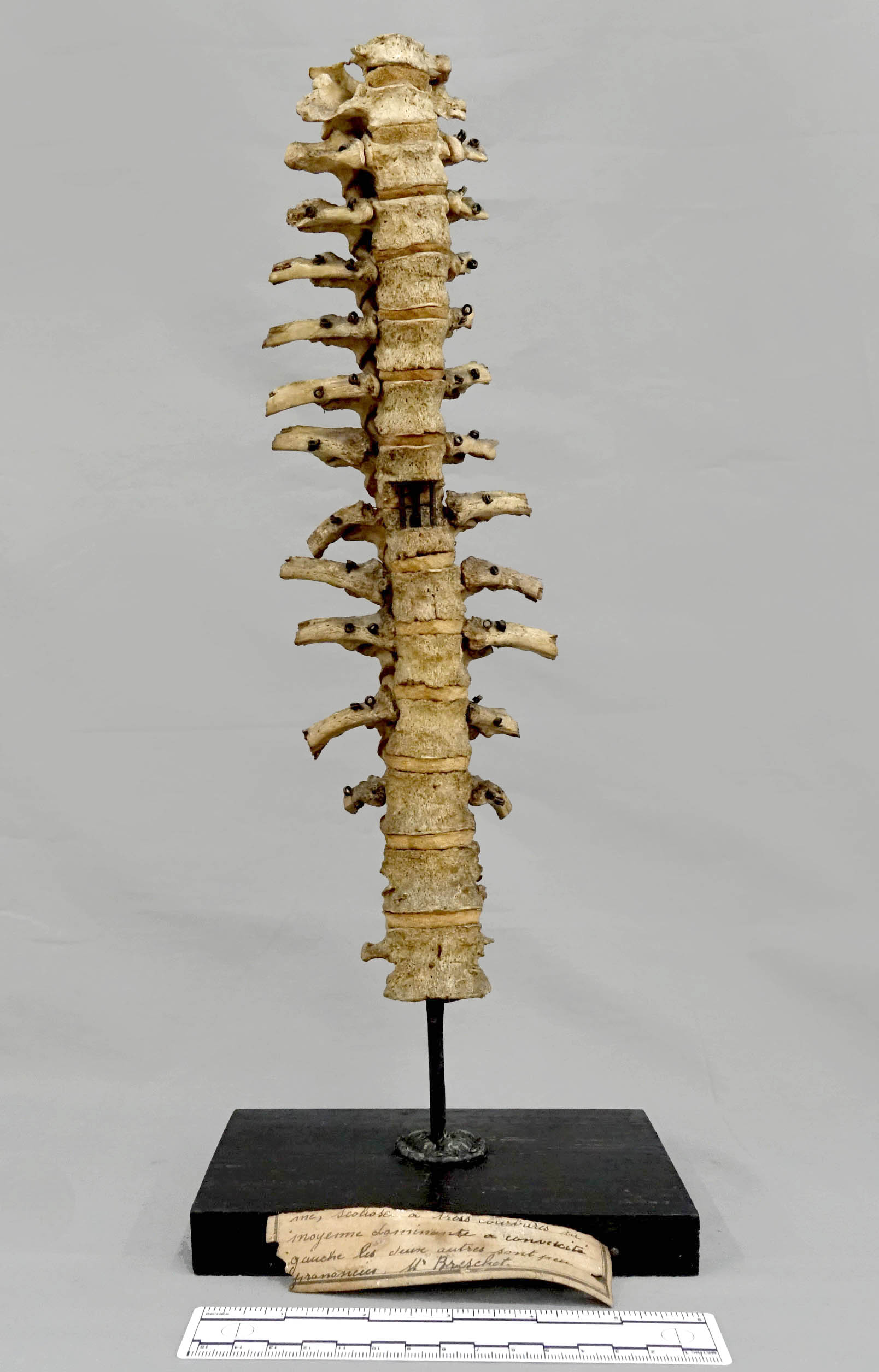
Scoliosis

Breschet made many contributions in comparative anatomy and in his research on zoonotic diseases. In 1813 with François Magendie (1783–1855), he demonstrated that rabies can be transmitted from the saliva of humans to dogs. Also, he was the first to create an accurate figure of the rete mirabile in whales and dolphins, a vascular network that allows these mammals to survive and adapt in ocean depths; a feature discovered by Edward Tyson.

He did extensive anatomical studies of the veins of the cranium and spine and made important investigations of the auditory system in vertebrates. He provided a comprehensive description of the utricle and saccule of the inner ear, and is credited for introducing the terms "otoconia" and "helicotrema". The helicotrema is sometimes referred to as "Breschet's hiatus", a passageway that connects the scala tympani and scala vestibuli at the top of the cochlea. Breschet has several other anatomical terms named after him, including:

- Breschet's bone(s): Small ossicles occasionally found in the ligaments of the sternoclavicular articulation. Also known as "os suprasternale" or as an episternal bone.
- Breschet's canals: (canales diploici), Channels in the diploe of the skull that accommodate the diploic veins.
- Breschet's sinus: Also known as the sphenoparietal sinus.
- Breschet's veins: (venae diploici), Diploic veins connected with the cerebral sinuses by emissary veins.

In 1842, he was elected a foreign member of the Royal Swedish Academy of Sciences.

== Selected publications ==
- Essai sur les veines du rachis, 1819.
- Traité des maladies des enfants, two volumes 1833.
- Traité d’anatomie humaine, with Alexandre Brière de Boismont (1797–1881), 1834.
- Histoire anatomique et physiologique d'un organe de nature vasculaire découvert dans les Cétacés, Suivie de quelques considérations sur la respiration de ces animaux et des amphibies, 1836.
