= List of theatres and entertainment venues in Paris =

This List of theatres and entertainment venues in Paris includes present-day opera houses and theatres, cabarets, music halls and other places of live entertainment in Paris. It excludes theatrical companies and outdoor venues. Former venues are included in the List of former or demolished entertainment venues in Paris and jazz venues in the List of jazz clubs in Paris.

The list is by name in alphabetical order, but it can be resorted by address, arrondissement, opening date (of the building, not the performing company), number of seats (main + secondary stage), or main present-day function. Former names of the theatre (again the building, not the performing company) are included in the notes.

== List ==
Name	Address	Arrt	Opened	Seats	Present use	Notes
AccorHotels Arena	boulevard de Bercy	12th	1984	17000	concerts	formerly Palais omnisports de Paris-Bercy and Bercy Arena
Aktéon	11, rue Général Blaise	11th	1986	60	theatre (plays), concerts	
Alhambra	21, rue Yves-Toudic	11th	2008	530	music hall	formerly Théâtre Art Déco des Cheminots
Artistic-Athévains	45bis, rue Richard-Lenoir	11th	1913	220	theatre (plays)	formerly Folies Artistic, Artistic Concert, Artistic Voltaire
Ateliers Berthier	2, rue Corneille	6th	2003	500	theatre (plays)	second stage of the Théâtre de l'Odéon
Bataclan	50, boulevard Voltaire	11th	1865	1500	general	
Le Batofar	riverbank of the Seine	13th	1998	300	night club on boat	
Le Boeuf sur le Toit	34, rue du Colisee	8th	1922		cabaret	founded at 28 rue Boissy d’Anglas (1922), moved to 33, rue Boissy d’Anglas (1928), moved again to 26 rue de Penthièvre (1928), moved to 41 bis avenue Pierre 1er de Serbie (1936), moved to 34, de la rue du Colisée (1941).
Bobino	20, rue de la Gaîté	14th	1800	430	music hall	Les Folies Bobino (1873), Studio Bobino (1991), Gaieté Bobino, Bobin’o (2007)
Théâtre des Bouffes du Nord	37bis, boulevard de la Chapelle	10th	1876	503	theatre (plays)	formerly Théâtre Molière, Théâtre des Carrefours
Boule Noire	120, boulevard de Rochechouart	18th	1822	200	concerts	
Cabaret Michou	80, rue des Martyrs	18th	1956		cabaret	
Café de la Danse	5, passage Louis Philippe	11th		250	concerts	
Café de la Gare	41, rue du Temple	4th	1968	450	theatre (plays)	formerly Auberge de l'Aigle d'Or (17th century)
Casino de Paris	16, rue de Clichy	9th	1880	1500	music hall	
Caveau de la République	1, boulevard Saint-Martin	3rd	1901	450	chanson	
La Cigale	120, boulevard de Rochechouart	18th	1887	1389	concerts	
Les Cinq Diamants	10, rue des Cinq-Diamants	13th	1975	93	theatre (plays)	
Cirque d'hiver	110, rue Amelot	11th	1852	1650	indoor circus	formerly Cirque Napoléon
Comédie-Caumartin	25, rue de Caumartin	9th	1901	390	theatre (plays)	
Comédie de Paris	42, rue Fontaine	9th	1929	184	theatre (plays)	formerly Menus-Plaisirs, Théâtre de l'Humour, Jeune-Colombier, Théâtre d'Essai, Nouveau Théâtre Libre, Studio-Théâtre, Love-Théâtre
Comédie République	1, boulevard Saint Martin	3rd		200	theatre (plays)	
La Comédie des boulevards	39, rue du Sentier	2nd		100	one-man shows	also using Théâtre du Gymnase Marie Bell
Comédie-Française (Salle Richelieu)	2, rue de Richelieu	1st	1790	800	theatre (plays)	
La Comédie Italienne	19, rue de la Gaîté	14th	1980		theatre (plays)	
Conservatoire de Paris (Théâtre du Conservatoire)	avenue Jean Jaurès	19th			music, dance and drama	
Crazy Horse	12, avenue George V	8th	1951		cabaret	
Le Divan du Monde	75, rue des Martyrs	18th	1873	500	concerts	formerly Divan japonais, Théâtre de la Comédie mondaine
Élysée Montmartre	72, boulevard de Rochechouart	18th	1897	1200	concerts	damaged by fire March 2011
Espace Cardin	1, avenue Gabriel	8th	1929	673	general	
Étoile du Nord	16, rue Georgette Agutte	18th		200	general	
Européen	5, rue Biot	17th	1872	350	music hall	
Flèche d'Or	102bis, rue Bagnolet	20th			concerts	
Folies Bergère	32, rue Richer	9th	1869	1679	music hall	formerly Folies Trévise
La Java	105, rue du Faubourg du Temple	10th	1920		concerts	
Lapin Agile	22, rue des Saules	18th	c 1860		cabaret	
Laurette Théâtre	36, rue Bichat	10th	1981		general	formerly Théâtre de la Mainate, Cabaret des Fous
Lavoir Moderne Parisien	35, rue Léon	18th	1953	200	concerts	
Lido	116bis, avenue des Champs-Élysées	8th	1946	1150	cabaret	
Limonaire	18, Cité Bergère	9th		50	chanson	
Le Living b'art	15, rue de La Vieuville	18th			general	
Lucernaire	53, rue Notre-Dame-des-Champs	6th	1978	118 + 118 + 50	cultural centre	occupies former factory building
Maison de la Poésie	passage Molière, 157, rue Saint-Martin	3rd	1791	189	poetry	formerly Théâtre des Sans-culottes, Théâtre de la rue Saint-Martin, Théâtre des Artistes en Société, Théâtre des Variétés Nationales et Etrangères, Théâtre Molière
La Maroquinerie	23, rue Boyer	20th	1997	500	concerts	
Moulin Rouge	82, boulevard de Clichy	18th	1889	850	cabaret	
Nouveau Casino	109, rue Oberkampf	11th	1850	400	concerts	formerly Saint-Pierre, Folies d’Athènes
La Nouvelle Ève	25, rue Fontaine	9th		280	cabaret/music hall	former name Théâtre des Fantaisies-Parisiennes
Odéon-Théâtre de l'Europe	2, rue Corneille	6th	1819	800	theatre (plays)	formerly Second Théâtre-Français
Olympia	28, boulevard des Capucines	9th	1889	1772	music hall	formerly Montagnes Russes
Olympic Café	20, rue Léon	18th	1934		concerts	opened 1934
Opéra Bastille	place de la Bastille	12th	1989	2723	opera	
Théâtre national de l'Opéra-Comique (Salle Favart)	place Boïeldieu	2nd	1898	1248	opera	
Le Palace	8, rue du Faubourg-Montmartre	9th	1921	984	general	
Palais des congrès de Paris	2, place de la Porte Maillot	17th	1974	3723	general	
Palais des Sports	1, place de la Porte de Versailles	15th	1960	4600	general	
Palais Garnier	place de l'Opéra	9th	1875	2200	ballet, opera	
Paradis Latin	28, rue du Cardinal Lemoine	5th	1889		cabaret	
Pépinière Théâtre	7, rue Louis-le-Grand	2nd	1919	347	theatre (plays)	formerly Théâtre de la Potinière, Théâtre Isola, Théâtre Louis-le-Grand, Théâtre des deux Masques, Biothéâtre, Pépinière Opéra
Philharmonie de Paris	2, Avenue Jean-Jaurès	19th	2015	2400	concert halls	
Salle Gaveau	45, rue la Boétie	8th	1906	1020	concert hall	
Salle Pleyel	252, rue du Faubourg Saint-Honoré	8th	1927	1913	concert hall	
Le Splendid	48, rue du Faubourg Saint-Martin	10th	1896	300	theatre (plays)	
Sudden Théâtre	14bis, rue Sainte Isaure	18th			theatre (plays)	
Théâtre 13	103A, boulevard Auguste-Blanqui	13th	1981	250	theatre (plays)	
Théâtre 14 Jean-Marie Serreau	20, avenue Marc Sangnier	14th	1982	192	theatre (plays)	
Théâtre Antoine-Simone Berriau	14, boulevard de Strasbourg	10th	1866	780	theatre (plays)	formerly Théâtre des Menus-Plaisirs, Théâtre des Arts, Opéra-Bouffe, Comédie-Parisienne, Théâtre-Libre
Théâtre ChoChotte	34, rue St André des Arts	6th			erotic	
Théâtre Darius Milhaud	80, allée Darius Milhaud	19th		65 + 35 + 20	general	
Théâtre Daunou	7, rue Daunou	2nd	1921	450	theatre (plays)	
Théâtre d'Edgar	58, bvd Edgar Quinet	14th	1975	80	theatre (plays)	
Théâtre de Dix Heures	36, boulevard de Clichy	18th	1890	140	comedy	formerly Cabaret des Arts
Théâtre de l'Atelier	1, place Charles Dullin	18th	1822	563	theatre (plays)	formerly Théâtre de Montmartre
Théâtre de l'Athénée	7, rue Boudreau, sq de l'Opera-Louis-Jouvet	9th	1883	570 + 91	opera, theatre (plays), concerts	formerly Éden-Théâtre, Grand-Théâtre, Comédie-Parisienne
Théâtre de l'Est Parisien	159, avenue Gambetta	20th	1988	750 + 200	theatre (plays)	
Théâtre de l'Œuvre	55, rue de Clichy	9th	1893	326	theatre (plays)	
Théâtre de la Bastille	76, rue de la Roquette	11th		261 + 155	theatre (plays), dance	
Théâtre de la Cité internationale	17, boulevard Jourdan	14th	1936		general	
Théâtre de la Gaîté-Montparnasse	26, rue de la Gaîté	14th	1868	500	theatre (plays)	
Théâtre de La Grande Comédie	40, rue Clichy	9th	2005	400 + 100		
Théâtre de la Huchette	23, rue de la Huchette	5th	1948	85	theatre (plays)	
Théâtre de la Madeleine	19, rue de Surène	8th	1924	709	theatre (plays)	
Théâtre de la Main d'Or	15, passage de la Main-d'Or	11th			one-man shows	
Théâtre de la Michodière	4bis, rue de la Michodière	2nd	1925	700	theatre (plays)	
Théâtre de la Porte Saint-Martin	18, boulevard Saint-Martin	10th	1873	1800	theatre (plays)	
Théâtre de la Renaissance	20, boulevard Saint-Martin	10th	1873	650	theatre (plays)	
Théâtre de la Ville	2, place du Châtelet	4th	1874	1000	general	formerly Sarah Bernhardt
Théâtre de Ménilmontant	15, rue du Retrait	20th	1877	86	theatre (plays)	
Théâtre de Paris	15, rue Blanche	9th	1891	1100 + 300	theatre (plays)	
Théâtre de Poche Montparnasse	75, boulevard du Montparnasse	6th	1942	220	theatre (plays)	
Théâtre Déjazet	41, boulevard du Temple	3rd	1851	600	general	
Théâtre des Abbesses	31, rue des Abbesses	18th	1996	420	general	
Théâtre des Blancs Manteaux	15, rue des Blancs Manteaux	4th	1972			
Théâtre des Bouffes-Parisiens	4, rue Monsigny	2nd	1855	668	theatre (plays)	
Théâtre des Champs-Élysées	15, avenue Montaigne	8th	1913	1905	concert hall, opera	
Théâtre des Deux Ânes	100, boulevard de Clichy	18th	1910	300	chanson	formerly La Truie qui file, L'Araignée, Le Porc-Épic, L'Epatant, Les Truands
Théâtre des Mathurins	36, rue des Mathurins	8th		715 + 384 + 84	theatre (plays)	
Théâtre des Nouveautés	24, boulevard Poissonnière	9th	1921	585	theatre (plays)	
Théâtre des Variétés	7, boulevard Montmartre	2nd	1807	928	theatre (plays)	
Théâtre Douze	6, avenue Maurice Ravel	12th		230	general	
Théâtre du Châtelet	place du Châtelet	1st	1862	2500	opera, musicals, concerts	
Théâtre du Gymnase Marie Bell	38, boulevard Bonne-Nouvelle	10th	1820	800 + 160	one-man shows	
Théâtre du Lierre	22, rue du Chevaleret	13th	1980	200	theatre (plays), dance	
Théâtre du Marais	37, rue Volta	3rd	1976	80	theatre (plays)	
Théâtre du Nord-Ouest (Salle Laborey)	13, rue du Faubourg-Montmartre	9th		120 + 80	theatre (plays)	
Théâtre du Palais-Royal	38, rue Montpensier	1st	1641	750	theatre (plays)	
Théâtre du Point Virgule	7, rue Sainte-Croix-de-la-Bretonnerie	4th	1975		one-man shows	
Théâtre du Rond-Point	2bis, avenue Franklin-D.-Roosevelt	8th	1860	760	theatre (plays)	
Théâtre du Temps	9, rue du Morvan	11th	1980	50	Asian theatre	
Théâtre du Vieux-Colombier	21, rue du Vieux-Colombier	6th	1913	300	Comédie-Française	
Théâtre Édouard VII	10, place Édouard VII	9th	1913	800	theatre (plays)	
Théâtre Essaïon	6, rue Pierre au Lard	4th		100 + 70	theatre (plays), concerts	
Théâtre Fontaine	10, rue Pierre Fontaine	9th	1951	629	theatre (plays)	
Théâtre Grévin	10, boulevard Montmartre	9th	1900	210		
Théâtre Hébertot	78, boulevard des Batignolles	17th	1838	630 + 110	theatre (plays)	formerly Théâtre des Batignolles, Théâtre des Arts,
Théâtre La Bruyère	5, rue La Bruyère	9th	1943	335	theatre (plays)	
Théâtre le Guichet Montparnasse	15, rue du Maine	14th	1980	50	theatre (plays)	
Théâtre le Mélo d'Amélie	4, rue Marie Stuart	2nd	1994	90	theatre (plays)	formerly Théâtre Marie Stuart
Théâtre le Ranelagh	5, rue des Vignes	16th	1900	790	general	
Théâtre Les Déchargeurs	3, rue des Déchargeurs	1st	1982	100	general	
Théâtre Libre	4, boulevard de Strasbourg	10th	1932	300	theatre (plays), musicals	formerly Eldorado and Théâtre Comedia
Théâtre Marigny	avenue de Marigny	8th	1885	1024 + 311	general	
Théâtre Michel	38, rue des Mathurins	8th	1908	350	theatre (plays)	
Théâtre Mogador	25, rue de Mogador	9th	1913	1800	musicals	formerly Palace Theatre
Théâtre Montparnasse	31, rue de la Gaîté	14th	1886	715 + 200	theatre (plays)	formerly Théâtre Montparnasse-Gaston Baty
Théâtre Mouffetard	73, rue Mouffetard	5th			theatre (plays)	
Théâtre national de Chaillot	1, place du Trocadéro	16th	1937	1250 + 420	dance, theatre (plays)	
Théâtre national de la Colline	15, rue Malte-Brun	20th	1951	750 + 200	theatre (plays)	
Théâtre Paris-Villette	parc de la Villette; 211, avenue Jean Jaurès	19th	1985	200 + 70 + 30	theatre (plays)	
Théâtre Rive Gauche	6, rue de la Gaîté	14th		350	theatre (plays)	
Théâtre Saint-Georges	51, rue Saint-Georges	9th	1929	489	theatre (plays)	
Théâtre Silvia-Monfort	106, rue Brancion	15th	1992	456	theatre (plays), general	
Théâtre Trévise	14, rue de Trévise	9th		100	comedy shows	
Théâtre Tristan-Bernard	64, rue du Rocher	8th	1911	400	theatre (plays)	formerly Théâtre Albert-Ier, Théâtre Charles de Rochefort
Théo Théâtre	20, rue Théodore Deck	15th	1995	50	theatre (plays)	
Le Trabendo	parc de la Villette, 211, avenue Jean Jaurès	19th		700	concerts	
Le Trianon	80, boulevard de Rochechouart	18th	1895	1000	concerts	formerly Trianon-Concert, Trianon-Théâtre, Théâtre Victor-Hugo, Trianon Lyrique
Les Trois Baudets	64, boulevard de Clichy	18th		250	concerts, chanson	
Vingtième Théâtre	7, rue des Plâtrières	20th		245	general use	
Le Zèbre de Belleville	61–63, boulevard de Belleville	11th	1939	199	cabaret, concerts	

== See also ==
- List of jazz clubs in Paris
- List of former or demolished entertainment venues in Paris
