= Théâtre de la Cité-Variétés =

Theatre in France

Coordinates: 48.8559°N 2.34654°E

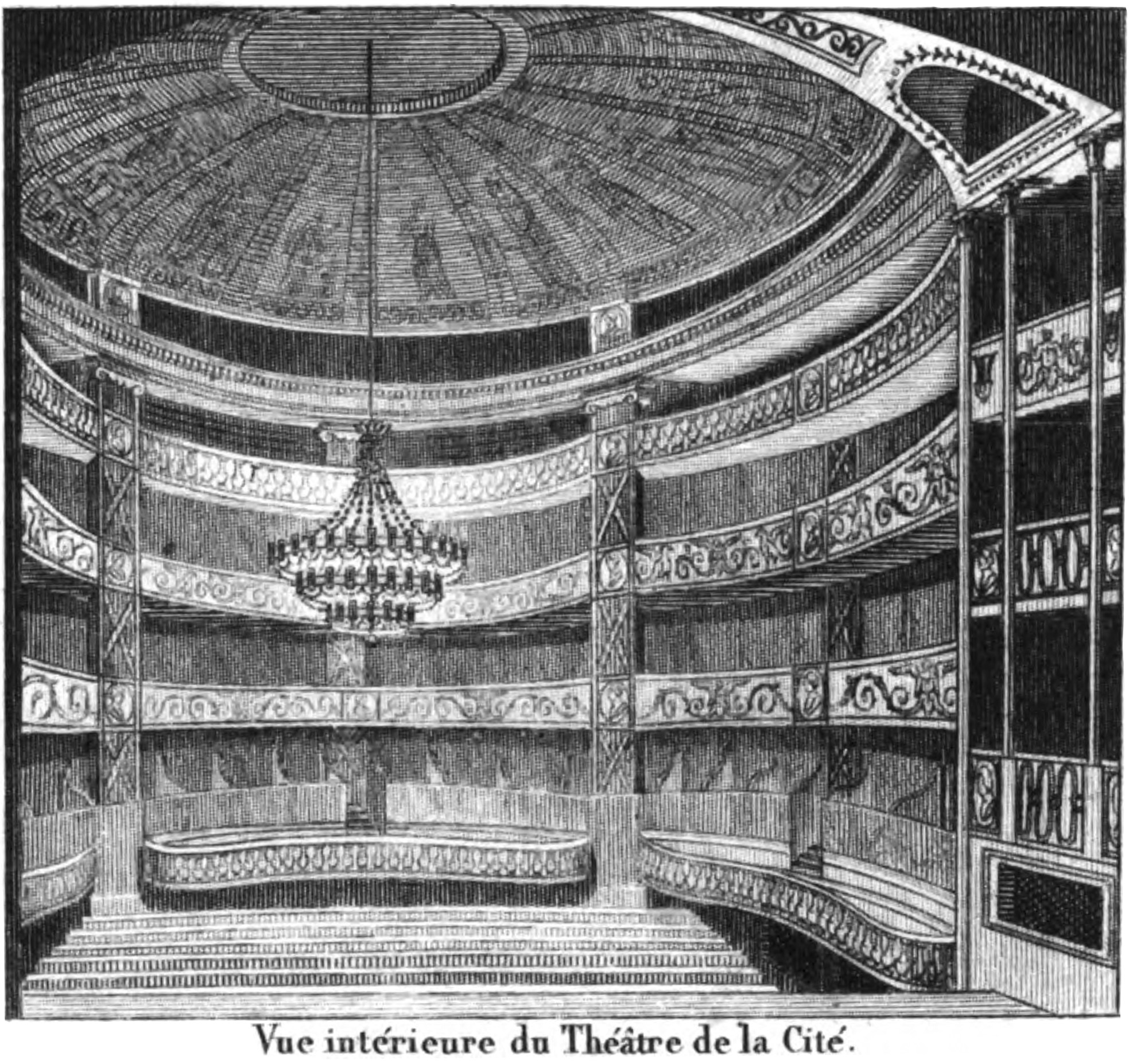
Interior view of the Théâtre de la Cité

The Théâtre de la Cité-Variétés, also known simply as the Théâtre de la Cité, was an entertainment venue now demolished, located in the former rue Saint-Barthélemy, now the Boulevard du Palais, on the Île de la Cité in the modern 4th arrondissement of Paris. The theatre had a capacity of 1,800–2,000 spectators.

== History ==
Built by the architect Nicolas Lenoir (who also designed the Théâtre de la Porte Saint-Martin) on the site of the Église Saint-Barthélemy, which façade it retained, the hall was inaugurated on 20 October 1792. From October 1792 to November 1793 it was named Théâtre du Palais-Variétés because of its proximity to the Palais de Justice. The venue was later renamed Théâtre de la Cité-Variétés.

From October 1792 to May 1800 the theatre was managed by Nicolas Lenoir, also known as Lenoir du Romain, and his nephew, known as Lenoir de Saint-Edme. Thereafter, it had a number of different managers, including Nicolas Cammaille-Saint-Aubin (May 1800 – February 1801), César Ribié and Louis Ferville (3 February – August 1801), Lenoir de Saint-Edme (November 1802 – September 1803, 23 October 1803 – June 1805), and an association of actors under the direction of Jean-François de Brémond de la Rochenard, dit Beaulieu (4 August 1805 – September 1806). The repertory included comedies, comédies-vaudevilles, melodramas, patriotic scenes, opéras-bouffes, opéras-folies, opéras-comiques, ballets-pantomimes, and pantomimes.

From 16 November to 6 December 1801 a German troupe known as the Théâtre Mozart, directed by Haselmayer and the bass Elmenreich, presented the first operas to be performed in German in Paris: Die Entführung aus dem Serail by Mozart (16 November), Das rothe Käppchen by Carl Ditters von Dittersdorf (21 November), Das Neusonntagskind by Wenzel Müller (25 November), Der Spiegel von Arkadien by Franz Xaver Süssmayr (29 November), Der Tiroler Wastel by Jakob Haibel (30 November), and Das Sonnenfest der Braminen by Müller (3 December). The conductor of the French orchestra was Frédéric Blasius, who came from a German family.

Other groups sometimes used the theatre on the odd nights, when the resident company was not performing. From 11 June to 1 October 1799, the artists of the Odéon (destroyed by fire on 18 March) found sanctuary at the Cité. Beginning on 22 January 1804 the artists of the Théâtre Olympique on the Rue de la Victoire performed at the Cité for one year. From 22 January 1804 to 4 June 1807 the troupe of the Variétés-Montansier, evicted from their theatre at the Palais-Royal, appeared at the Cité.

Napoleon's decree on the theatres of 29 July 1807 condemned the Théâtre de la Cité to oblivion. The final performance was on 10 August 1807.

== Bal du Prado ==
Lenoir constructed a ballroom on the site in January 1809, which in 1846 took the name Bal du Prado, itself razed in 1859 to allow for the construction of the tribunal de commerce de Paris.

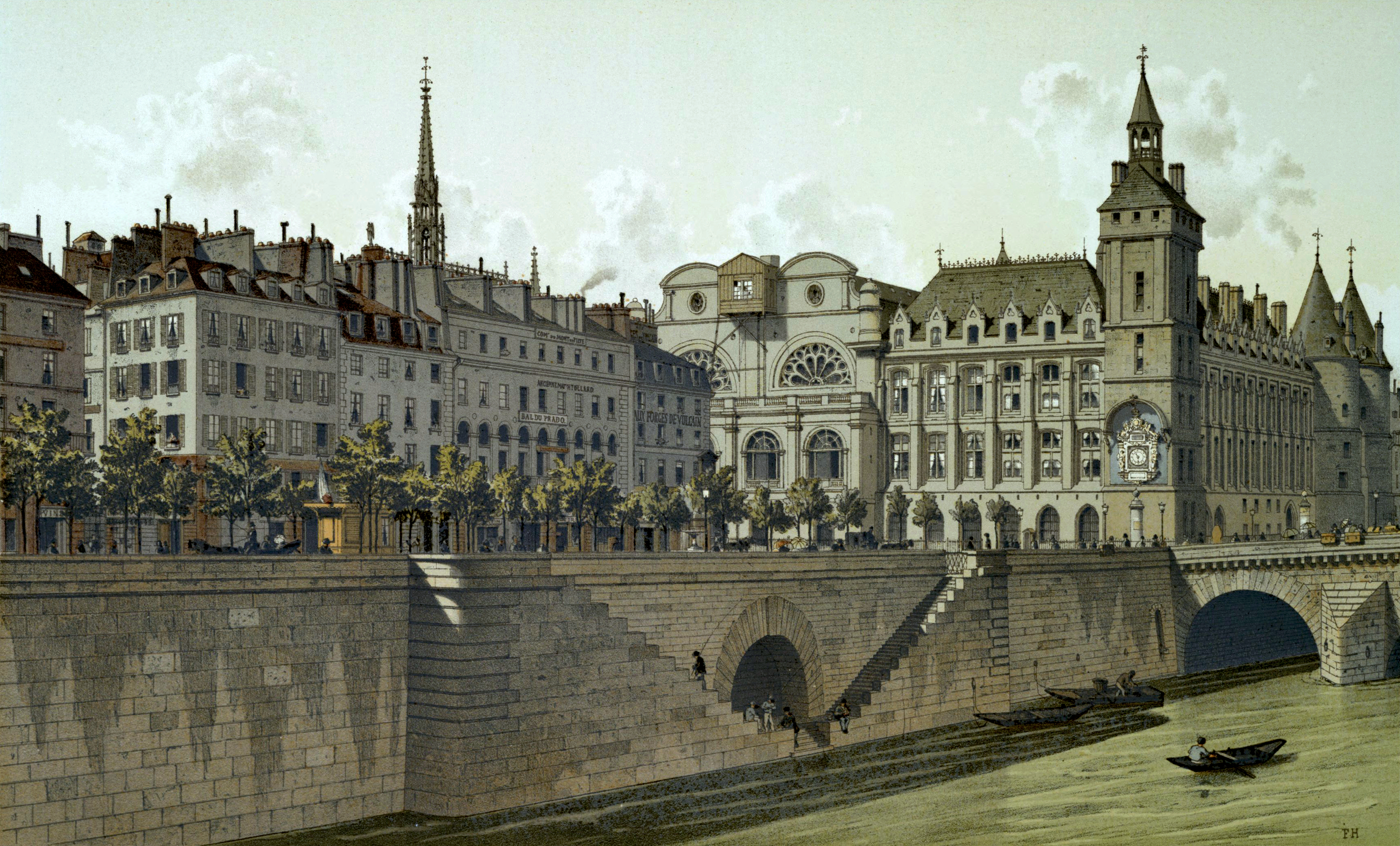
Le bal du Prado, on the site of the former theatre, c. 1855

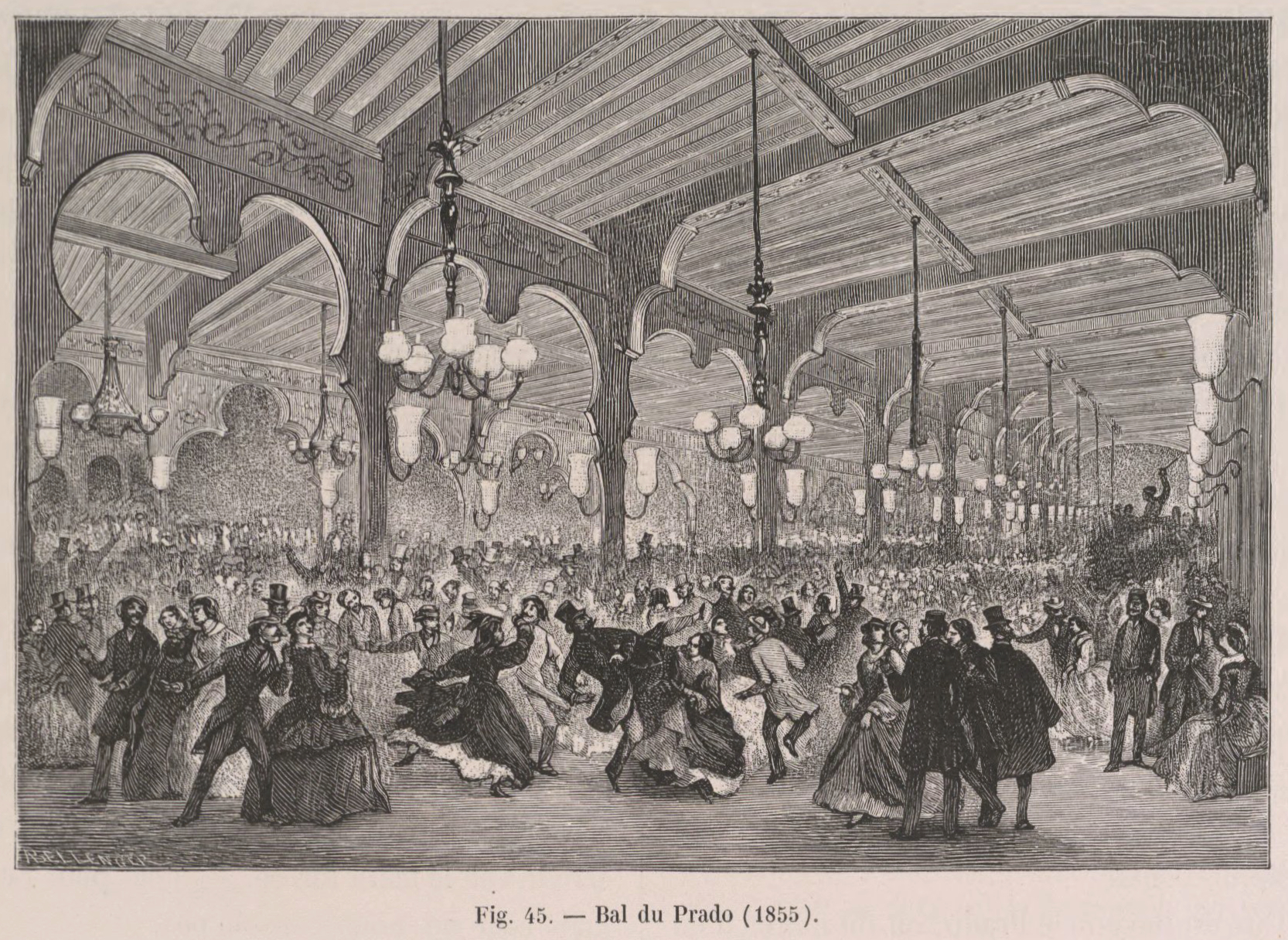
Le bal du Prado in 1855, by Theodor Josef Hubert Hoffbauer

== See also ==
- List of former or demolished entertainment venues in Paris

== Bibliography ==
- Castil-Blaze (1856). Théâtres lyriques de Paris. Opéra italien de 1548 à 1856. Paris: Castil-Blaze. Copy at Google Books.
- Donnet, Alexis (1821). Architectonographie des théâtres de Paris. Paris: P. Didot l'ainé. Copy at Google Books. See the chapter "Théâtre de la Cité".
- Lecomte, L.-Henry (1910). Le Théâtre de la Cité. Paris: Daragon. View at the Internet Archive.
- Loewenberg, Alfred (1978). Annals of Opera 1597–1940 (third edition, revised). Totowa, New Jersey: Rowman and Littlefield. ISBN 9780874718515.
- Wild, Nicole ([1989]). Dictionnaire des théâtres parisiens au XIXe siècle: les théâtres et la musique. Paris: Aux Amateurs de livres. ISBN 9780828825863. ISBN 9782905053800 (paperback). View formats and editions at WorldCat.
