= Marie-Adélaïde Barthélemy-Hadot =

French novelist and playwright

- Born: 15 June 1763; Troyes, France
- Died: 19 February 1821 (aged 57); Paris, France
- Occupations: Playwright; Novelist
- Spouse: Barthélémy Hadot

Marie-Adélaïde Hadot, known under the name Barthélemy-Hadot, née Richard (French: [maʁi adelɑ̃id baʁtelemi adɔ]; 15 June 1763 – 19 February 1821) was an early 19th-century French novelist and playwright.

== Biography ==
The daughter of the choral vicar of the collegiate church of Saint-Étienne, Marie-Adélaïde married a schoolmaster named Barthélémy Hadot on January 11, 1785. Hadot also ran a small grocery store, supplemented by his woman in one and the other function. Hadot embraced with warmth the party of the Revolution, became municipal officer and a member of the Revolutionary Committee.

Although he showed some moderation in performing these jobs, the school found himself completely abandoned after the fall of Robespierre and the couple was forced to take refuge in Paris. She soon became a widow and had no other resources to live than to engage in literary works in which she gave herself without reserve, while holding a small boarding school that had little success.

Barthélemy-Hadot was one of the most prolific writers in her genre. She found time to compose, from 1804 until her death, many melodramas for boulevard theatres and at the same time, many novels little remarkable in style and still and even less by invention, but whose intentions were good, with enough moral background. Over all, she made more than a hundred volumes, not counting those she left in manuscript, dramas and novels, most of which were not intended for education. Some of her plays that were performed remained unpublished. Others were neither presented nor printed.

A daughter born in Troyes in 1795, married a Mr. Letac, and followed the same literary path than her mother. She wrote several novels which sometimes were wrongly attributed to Marie-Adélaïde.

== Main publications ==
=== Theater ===
- 1804: Zadig, ou la Destinée, mélodrame héroïque in 5 acts from the novella by Voltaire, Paris, Fages, 1804, in-8°.
- 1800: Jean Sobieski, ou la Lettre, melodrama, Maldan, in-8°.
- 1806: Jules, ou le Toit paternel, melodrama, Maldan.
- 1806: L’Homme mystérieux, five-act melodrama, Maldan, in-8°.
- 1809: Cosme de Médicis, three-act melodrama (with René Perin), Fages.
- 1816: L’Honneur et l’Échafaud, Barba.
- 1816: Les Deux Valladomir, three-act melodrama (with Victor Ducange), Fages, in-8°.
- 1814: Charles Martel (with Philippe-Jacques de Laroche), melodrama given 11 February at the Théâtre de la Gaîté, but not printed.

=== Novels ===
- 1815: Anne de Russie et Catherine d’Autriche, Paris, Pigoreau
- 1810: Clotilde de Hapsbourg, ou le Tribunal de Neustadt, Pigoreau
- 1816: Les Héritiers du duc de Bouillon, ou les Français à Alger, Pigoreau, 4 vol. in-12.
- 1814: Jacques Ier, roi d’Écosse, ou les Prisonniers de la tour de Londres, Pigoreau, 4 vol. in-12.
- 1812: Les Mines de Mazara, ou les Trois sœurs, Pigoreau, 4 vol. in-12.
- 1818: Ernest de Vendôme, ou le Prisonnier de Vincennes, Pigoreau, 4 vol. in-12.
- 1815: La Tour du Louvre, ou le Héros de Bouvines, Pigoreau, 4 vol. in-12.
- 1817: Isabelle de Pologne, ou la Famille fugitive, Pigoreau
- Pierre le Grandet les Strélitz, ou la Forteresse de la Moscowa, Paris, Lecointe et Durey, 5 vol. in-12.
- Mademoiselle de Montdidier, ou la Cour de Louis XI, Paris, A. Marc, 4 vol. in-12 (posthumous).
- 1817: Les Vénitiens, ou le Capitaine français, Paris, Lecointe et Durey.

=== Morale ===
- 1811: Loisirs d’une bonne mère, ou le Décaméron de l’adolescence, Paris, Déterville et Delaunay, 2 vol. in-12.
- 1815: Les Soirées de famille, 5 vol. in-12.

== Sources ==
- Louis-Gabriel Michaud, Biographie universelle ancienne et moderne, Paris, Desplaces, 1857, (p. 321–22).
- Jacques-Alphonse Mahul, Annuaire nécrologique, ou Supplément annuel et continuation de toutes les biographies ou dictionnaires historiques, 2e année, 1821, Paris : Ponthieu, 1822, (p. 207–209)
