= List of former or demolished entertainment venues in Paris =

This page is a list of former or demolished theatres and other entertainment venues. For currently operating theatres, see List of theatres and entertainment venues in Paris.

== List ==
Name	Address	Arrt	Notes
A.B.C	11, boulevard Poissonnière	2nd	music-hall opened 1935, turned into a cinema 1965 then demolished c 1981.
Alcazar	10, rue du Faubourg-Poissonnière	10th	café-concert opened 1858, closed 1902, demolished and replaced by offices
Alhambra-Maurice Chevalier	50, rue de Malte	11th	music hall, opened 1866, demolished 1967
Apollo	20, rue de Clichy	9th	music hall
Athénée	17, rue Scribe	9th	opened 1866, closed 1883
Le Chat Noir	84, boulevard Rochechouart	9th	cabaret opened 1881, closed 1897
Cirque d'été	Champs-Élysées	8th	circus built 1841, demolished 1900
Concert Mayol	Rue de l'échiquier	10th	closed 1976
Concert Pacra	10, boulevard Beaumarchais	11th	'salle de spectacle', opened 1855, demolished 1972
Éden-Théâtre	7, rue Boudreau	9th	opened 1883, demolished 1895
Folies-Marigny	Carré Marigny on the Champs-Élysées	8th	opened 1848, demolished 1881
Théâtre des Funambules	boulevard du Temple		First for tightrope-walking and acrobatics later vaudeville etc., opened 1816, demolished 1862
Grand Guignol	7, cité Chaptal	9th	opened 1897, closed 1963
Théâtre Historique	72, boulevard du Temple	9th	opened 1847, demolished 1863
Hôtel de Bourgogne	rue Mauconseil (now rue Étienne Marcel)	2nd	theatre built in 1548, used until at least 1783
Théâtre des Jeunes-Artistes	52, rue de Bondy	10th	opened 1790, closed 1807
Salle de la Bourse	rue Vivienne	2nd	opened 1827, demolished 1869
Salle des Concerts Herz	48, rue de la Victoire	9th	concert hall, built 1842, demolished post-1874
Salle Le Peletier	rue Le Peletier	9th	home of the Paris Opera from 1821 to 1873. Destroyed by fire 1873.
Salle Ventadour	rue Neuve-Ventadour (now the rue Méhul)	2nd	opened in 1829, closed in 1878, converted into offices in 1879
Scala	13, boulevard de Strasbourg	10th	music hall built 1874, turned into cinema 1936
Théâtre d'Orsay	gare d'Orsay	7th	opened 1972, closed 1981
Théâtre de Cluny	71, boulevard Saint-Germain	5th	active c. 1879–1929
Théâtre de l'Ambigu-Comique	boulevard du Temple		founded in 1769, burnt down in 1827
Théâtre de l'Ambigu-Comique	boulevard Saint-Martin		rebuilt 1828, demolished in 1966
Théâtre de l'Empire	41, avenue Wagram		opened 1897, destroyed by fire 2005 and replaced by a hotel
Théâtre de l'Étoile	35, avenue Wagram	17th	opened 1928, closed 1964
Théâtre de la Cité-Variétés	rue Saint-Barthélemy	4th	very end of the 18th century, closed in 1806
Théâtre de la Gaîté	rue Papin		opened 1862, demolished 1989, also known as Théâtre de la Gaîté-Lyrique, Théâtre National Lyrique
Théâtre de Nicolet, ou des Grands Danseurs	boulevard du Temple		opened 1759, changed name to Théâtre de la Gaîté in 1792, closed 1862
Théâtre des Capucines	boulevard des Capucines		built 1889, converted into Théâtre-Musée des Capucines perfume museum 1970
Théâtre des Délassements-Comiques	boulevard du Temple		opened 1785, burnt down 1787, rebuilt and reopened 1788, demolished 1862
Théâtre des Deux Boules			erotic theatre, demolished
Théâtre des Folies-Dramatiques	rue de Bondy (now rue René Boulanger)	10th	turned into cinema in the 1930s
Théâtre des Gobelins	3, l'avenue des Gobelins	5th	built 1869, closed 2003 but facade preserved
Théâtre des Variétés-Amusantes	boulevard du Temple (now rue René-Boulanger)	10th	opened 1779, closed 1784
Théâtre du Vaudeville	boulevard des Capucines		built 1868, turned into a cinema in 1927
Théâtre du Vaudeville	rue de Chartres		opened 1792, burned down in 1838
Théâtre Fémina	90, avenue des Champs-Élysées	8th	opened 1907, closed 1929
Théâtre Feydeau	rue Feydeau	2nd	opera house 1791–1829. Demolished c. 1829.
Théâtre Louvois	6, rue de Louvois	2nd	built and opened 1791, demolished 1899
Théâtre National de la rue de la Loi	rue de la Loi (now rue de Richelieu)		built in 1793, demolished in 1820, also known as the Théâtre des Arts
Théâtre Pigalle	rue Pigalle		opened 1929, closed 1948, later demolished

== Bibliography ==
- (in French) Philippe Chauveau, Les Théâtres parisiens disparus (1402–1986), Ed. de l'Amandier, Paris, 1999. ISBN 2-907649-30-2.
- (in French) André Degaine, Histoire du théâtre dessinée et Guide des promenades théâtrales à Paris, Ed. Nizet, 1992–1999. ISBN 2-7078-1257-9.
