= Théâtre des Jeunes-Artistes =

Coordinates: 48.86875°N 2.35976°E

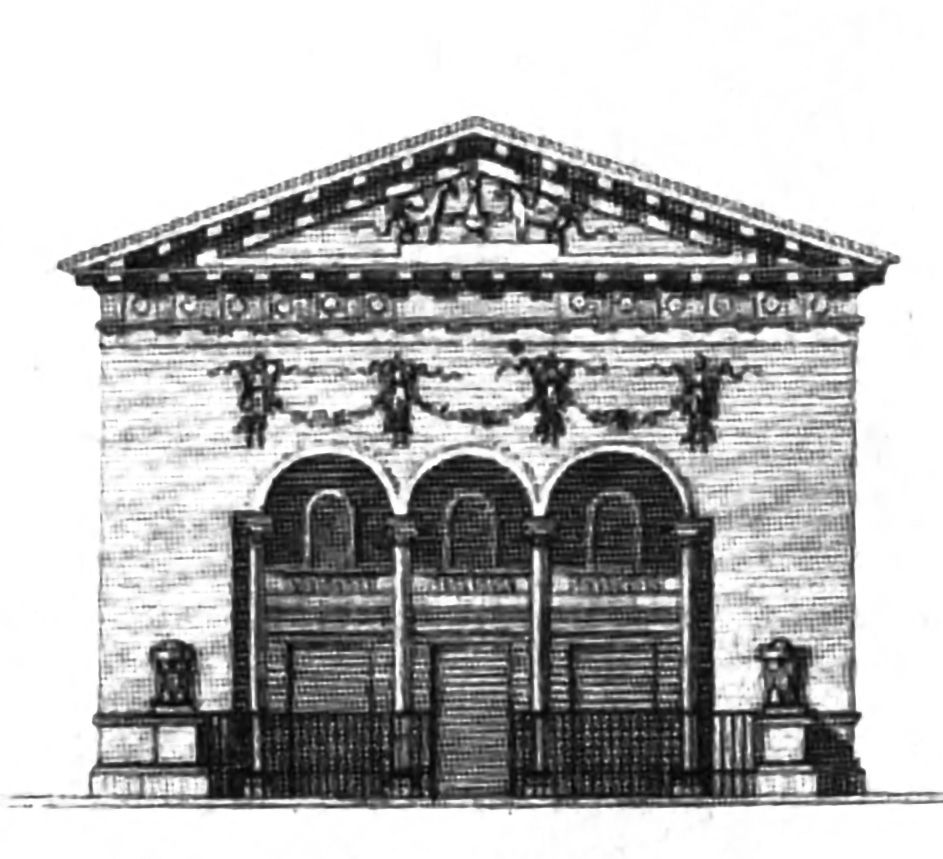
Facade of the Jeunes-Artistes

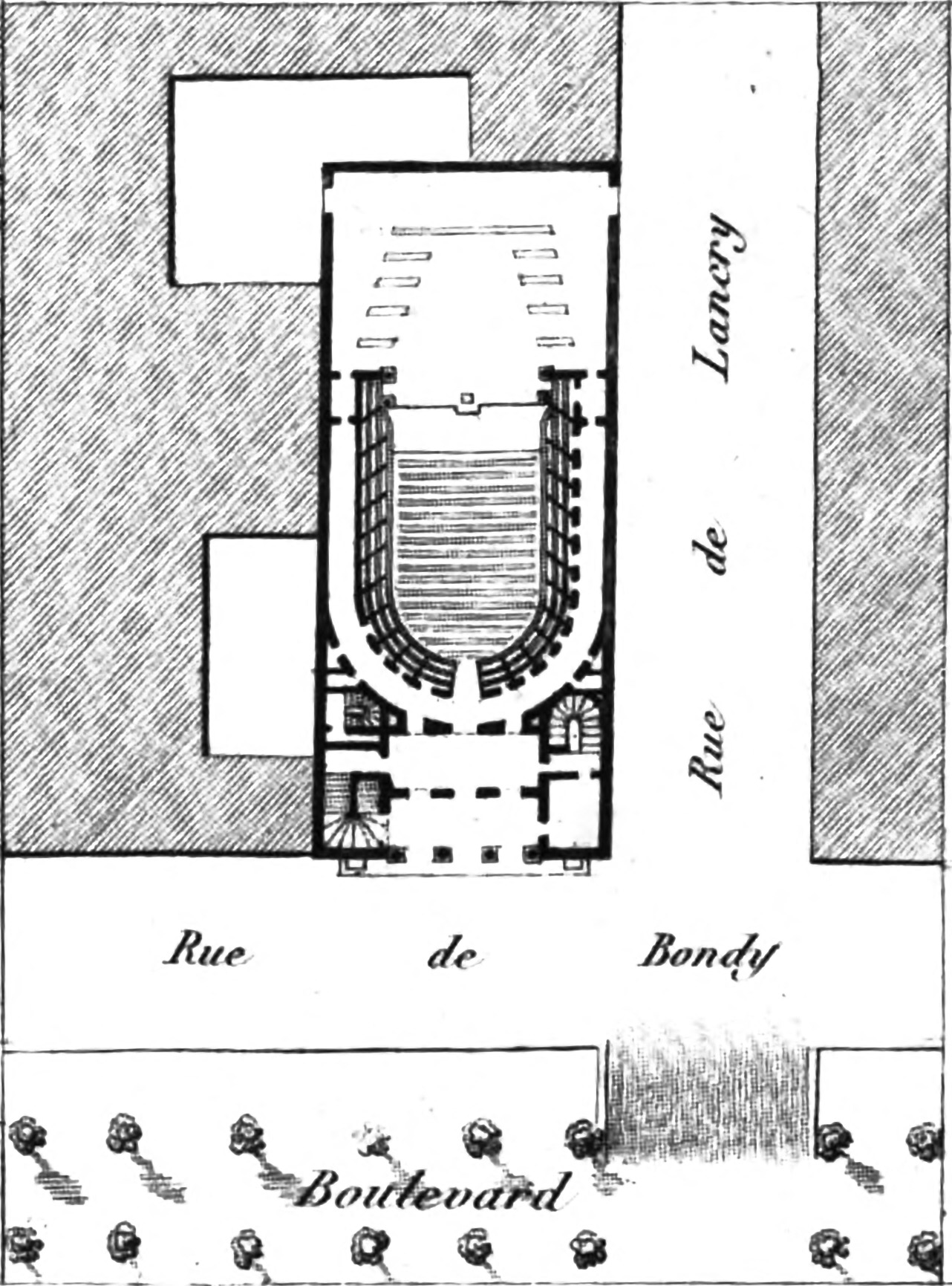
Plan of the Jeunes-Artistes

The Théâtre des Jeunes-Artistes was an 18th-century Parisian entertainment venue, now defunct, inaugurated in 1790 at 52 rue de Bondy (modern rue René-Boulanger) in the 10th arrondissement of Paris. It had a capacity of 520 spectators.

== History ==
Built on the site of the former Théâtre des Variétés-Amusantes on the northwest corner of the intersection of the rue de Bondy with the rue de Lancry, the theatre was inaugurated on 26 June 1790 under the name Théâtre Français Comique et Lyrique. It took the name Jeunes-Artistes in 1794 under the direction of Jacques Robillon who set up a troupe of child actors modeled on that of the Théâtre de l'Ambigu-Comique, which faced it (the idea was again taken over by Louis Comte and his Théâtre des Jeunes-Élèves in 1820).

Despite the great success it enjoyed, the theatre was closed following the Napoleonic decree of 8 August 1807 on the limitation of Parisian theaters.

== See also ==
- List of former or demolished entertainment venues in Paris

== Bibliography ==
- Philippe Chauveau, Les Théâtres parisiens disparus (1402-1986), éd. de l'Amandier, Paris, 1999 ISBN 2-907649-30-2
- Wild, Nicole ([1989]). Dictionnaire des théâtres parisiens au XIXe siècle: les théâtres et la musique. Paris: Aux Amateurs de livres. ISBN 9780828825863. ISBN 9782905053800 (paperback). View formats and editions at WorldCat.
