= Nicolas Cammaille-Saint-Aubin =

French playwright (1770–1832)

Nicolas Cammaille-Saint-Aubin (25 March 1770, Paris – 26 August 1832, Paris) was a French playwright.

== Biography ==
Cammaille made his acting debut at the Théâtre de l'Ambigu-Comique in 1792 and the very day after the assassination of Marat, announced in the Journal des spectacles that he had written a comedy in tribute to the Revolutionary leader. That was L'Ami du peuple ou Les intrigants démasqués which met an important success when given at the Ambigu-Comique in 1793. Le Concert de la rue Feydeau ou la Folie du jour written with René Perin triggered unrest in the political press conducted by Alphonse Martainville.

Director of the Ambigu-Comique in 1797, he became an employee by the Ministry of police after the Coup of 18 Fructidor then became head of the Théâtre de la Cité in 1800 a position he held only a year due to the little success of the plays that were presented at that time.

He continued to perform in his own plays then, in 1804, joined the troupe of the Théâtre de la Gaîté before passing in 1806 into that of the Théâtre Molière. In 1808, he was hired by the Théâtre de l'Impératrice but from that date no longer held leading roles. He left the stage as an actor in 1811.

After he entered the General Post Office in 1814, seriously ill, he spent the last year of his life in the Maison royale de santé where he died 26 August 1832 aged 52 ans.

== Works ==
- 1793: L'Ami du peuple ou Les intrigants démasqués, three-act comedy, in verse
- 1794: Le Concert de la rue Feydeau ou la Folie du jour, one-act comedy, in prose, with René Perin
- 1797: Marguerite, ou Les voleurs, one-act drama, mingled with pantomime, fights, etc., with Louis-François Ribié
- 1797: Le Moine, five-act comedy mingled withs, dances, pantomime
- 1797: La Fausse mère ou Une faute de l'amour, five-act drama
- 1799: Les Chinois ou Amour et nature, three-act dialogued pantomime
- 1800: L'Élève de la nature, ou le Nouveau peuple, three-act pantomime
- 1802: Ima, ou les Deux mondes, three-act allegorical melodrama, extravaganza
- 1803: Louise ou le Théâtre, one-act comedy
- 1805: La Fille de l'hospice, ou la Nouvelle Antigone, three-act melodrama, extravaganza, from the novel by Ducray-Duminil
- 1809: Le Prince de la Newa, three-act melodrama
- 1811: Boutade dialoguée à Napoléon père, sur la naissance du Roi de Rome
- 1817: Le Passage de la mer Rouge ou La délivrance des Hébreux
- undate: A la paix, song

== Bibliography ==
- Charles Ménétrier, Galerie historique des comédiens de la troupe de Nicolet, 1869, (p. 255–263)
- Henry Lyonnet, Dictionnaire des comédiens français, 1911
- Pierre Larousse, Grand Larousse encyclopédique, vol.2, 1960, (p. 545)
