= René Perin =

French playwright, publisher, translator and novelist

- Born: 1 November 1774; Paris, France
- Died: 9 May 1858 (aged 83); Paris, France
- Occupations: Playwright, translator, novelist

René Perin (1 November 1774 – 9 May 1858) was a 19th-century French playwright, publisher, translator and novelist.

== Biography ==
A lawyer and sous-préfet of Montluçon during the Hundred Days, he resigned from his positions when the Bourbons returned to power. He used several pseudonyms such as René de Biborium-Chateauterne or René Biborium de Chateauterne as a writer. His plays were presented on the most important Parisian stages of his time including the Théâtre de l'Ambigu-Comique, the Théâtre du Vaudeville, the Théâtre de l'Odéon, the Théâtre de la Gaîté, and the Théâtre des Variétés.

For thirty years he was a collaborator to the Moniteur, and he also wrote historical and geographical studies.

== Works ==
- Mr Jocrisse au sérail de Constantinople ou les Bêtises sont de tous les pays, calembour en trois actes, 1800
- Kosmouk, ou les Indiens à Marseille, comedy in 5 acts and in prose, arrangement of the play by Kotzebue, 1801
- Les Nouveaux athées, ou Réfutation des nouveaux saints, ouvrage en moins de 250 vers, enrichi de notes curieuses et historiques, 1801
- Respirons !, comedy in 1 act and in prose, mingled with vaudevilles, 1801
- Tous les niais de Paris, ou le Catafalque de Cadet-Roussel, bluette tragique in 5 acts and in verses, with Pillon-Duchemin, 1801
- L'incendie du Cap, ou Le règne de Toussaint-Louverture, 1802
- Le flageolet d'Erato, ou le chansonnier du vaudeville, 1802
- La Grande ville, ou les Parisiens vengés, comédie épisodique in 3 acts, in prose, with Anne-Adrien-Firmin Pillon-Duchemin, 1802
- Fitz Henri, drama in 3 acts, 1803
- Le Voyage autour de ma chambre, comédie en vaudeville in 1 act, 1803
- Molé aux Champs-Élysées, hommage en vers, mingled with songs and danses, with Pillon-Duchemin, 1803
- La mort de Cadet Roussel, tragédie pour rire in 5 acts and in verses, with Pillon-Duchemin, 1803
- L'Hermitage des Pyrénées, comedy in 1 act, mingled with song, 1805
- L'isle flottante, ou Les Voyageurs aériens, comédie féerie and extravaganza, in 1 act and in prose, 1806
- Jules, ou le Toit paternel, melodrama in 3 acts, with Rougemont, 1806
- Héléonor de Portugal, melodrama in 3 acts, extravaganza, 1807
- Les Comédiens par hasard, comedy in 1 act and in prose, 1807
- Les Suites d'un duel, comedy in 3 acts, in prose, 1807
- Le Concert de la rue Feydeau ou la Folie du jour, comedy in 1 act, in prose, with Nicolas Cammaille-Saint-Aubin, 1807
- L'Héroïsme des femmes, melodrama in 3 acts, extravaganza, ornated with song and dances, 1808
- J'arrive à temps, vaudeville in 1 act, 1808
- Cosme de Médicis, melodrama in 3 acts, in prose and extravaganza, with Marie-Adélaïde Barthélemy-Hadot, 1809
- Vie militaire de J. Lannes, maréchal de l'empire, duc de Montebello, 1809
- Sophie ou La nouvelle Cendrillon, comedy in 4 acts and in prose, with Rougemont, 1810
- Itinéraire de Pantin au Mont Calvaire en passant par la rue Mouffetard, le faubourg St-Marceau, le faubourg St-Jacques... ou Lettres inédites de Chactas à Atala, 1811
- Le Libelle, comedy in 1 act, in verses, 1811
- Ode sur la naissance du roi de Rome, 1811
- Beautés historiques de la maison d'Autriche... à l'usage de la jeunesse, 1811
- Esprit de J.-F. de La Harpe, 1814
- L'Intrigue avant la noce, comedy in 3 acts, 1814
- Henri IV et d'Aubigné, comedy in 3 acts and in prose, with Michel-Nicolas Balisson de Rougemont, 1814
- Dictionnaire des girouettes, ou Nos contemporains peints d'après eux-mêmes, with Pierre-Joseph Charrin, Alexis Eymery, César de Proisy d'Eppe, 1815
- Le Vieil oncle, comedy in 1 act and in prose, 1816
- Le Garçon Sans-Souci, ou Aventures sur aventures, humorous novel in 3 acts, 1818
- La Maison de Jeanne d'Arc, comédie anecdote in 1 act, in prose, 1818
- La Demande bizarre, comedy in 1 act, in prose, 1819
- La Bataille de Bouvines, ou le Rocher des tombeaux, mimodrame in 3 acts, extravaganza, with Ferdinand Laloue, 1821
- Isabelle de Levanzo, ou la Fille écuyer, melodrama in 3 acts and extravaganza, with Alexandre-Joseph Le Roy de Bacre, 1821
- La Cousine supposée, comedy in 1 act and in prose, with Adrien Payn, 1823
- Traits détachés de l'histoire, pour l'instruction de la jeunesse, et faisant suite à l'Éducation complète, ou Cours d'histoire universelle mêlé de chronologie, de Mme Le Prince de Beaumont, gathered by René Périn, 1825
- La laitière de Montfermeil, 1827
- Abrégé de la géographie sacrée, 1827
- La laitière de Montfermeil, vaudeville in 5 years, with Rougemont and Nicolas Brazier, 1827
- Le Noble et l'artisan, ou le Parent de tout le monde, comédie-vaudeville in 2 acts, with Théodore Anne, 1831
- Sophie et Mirabeau, ou 1773 et 1789, comédie-vaudeville in 2 acts, with Théodore Anne and Emmanuel Théaulon, 1831
- Album du Nouveau-Bellevue, 1836
- Jeanne d'Arc en prison, monologue in 1 act and in verses, with Élie Sauvage, 1844
- M. Lafleur, comédie-vaudeville in 1 act, with Paul Siraudin, 1844
- Le Goguettier sévrien, undated

== Bibliography ==
- Joseph Fr. Michaud, Louis Gabriel Michaud, Biographie universelle ancienne et moderne, vol.32, 1843, p. 493
- Jean-Marie Thomasseau, Le mélodrame, P.U.F, 1984, p. 50
