= Les Déchargeurs =

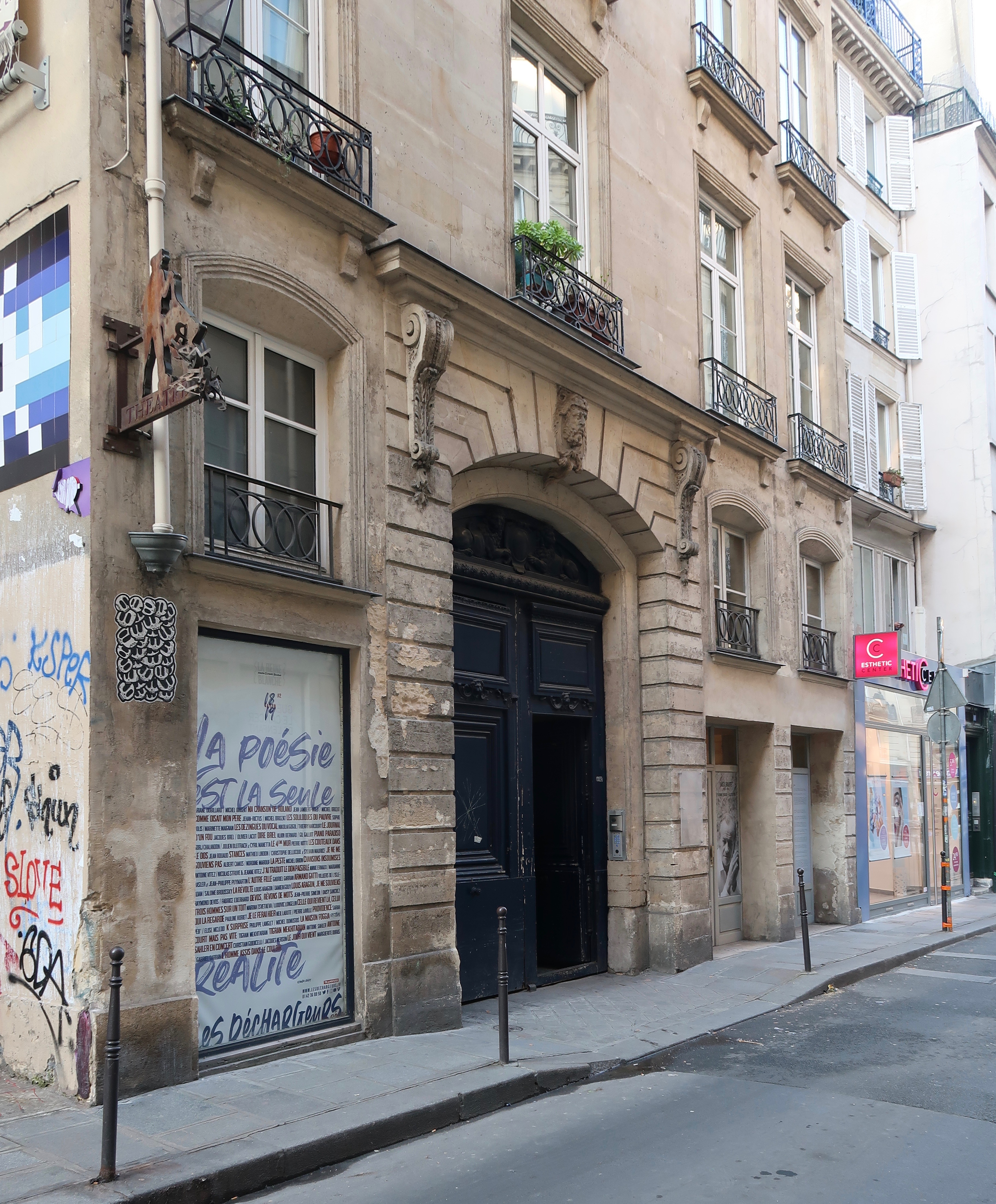
- Theatre entrance
- Interactive map of Les Déchargeurs
- Address: 3 rue des Déchargeurs, Pris 1er Paris
- Coordinates: 48°51′35.1″N 2°20′45.1″E
- Capacity: 76 (Vicky Messica); 19 (La Bohême)
- Type: Theatre

Construction
- Opened: 1979; 47 years ago

Website
- www.lesdechargeurs.fr

Les Déchargeurs (or Théâtre des Déchargeurs) is a performance venue located at 3, rue des Déchargeurs in Les Halles (1st arrondissement of Paris) It is served by the Châtelet and Hôtel de Ville metro stations.

== History ==
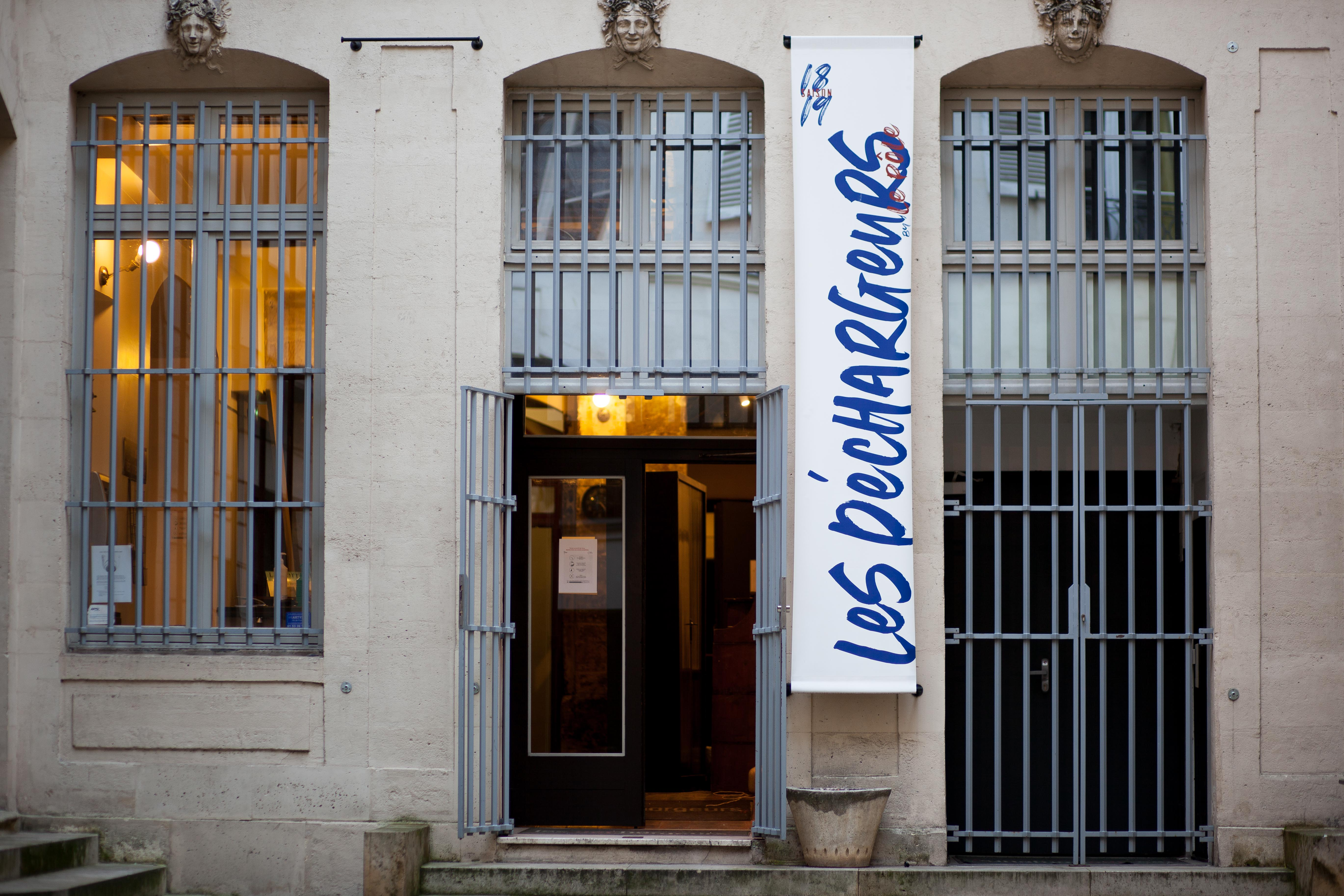
View of the theatre from the courtyard

=== Hôtel Rouillé ===
The building was constructed in 1708 for Marie Orceau, widow Rouillé, a member of the very wealthy Pajot and Rouillé family who owned La Poste, which at that time was a private enterprise located just a few meters away in the Hôtel de Villeroy. It is not known whether the Hôtel Rouillé was used as a family home or as an annex of the post office.

Photos by Eugène Atget, 1908

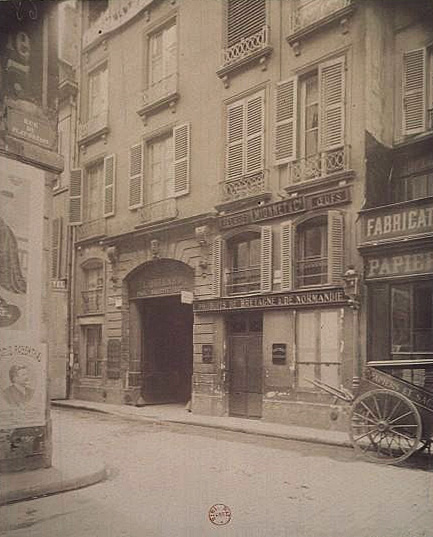
Street facade

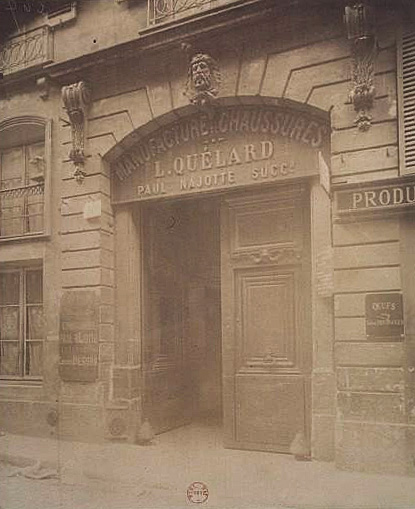
Gateway

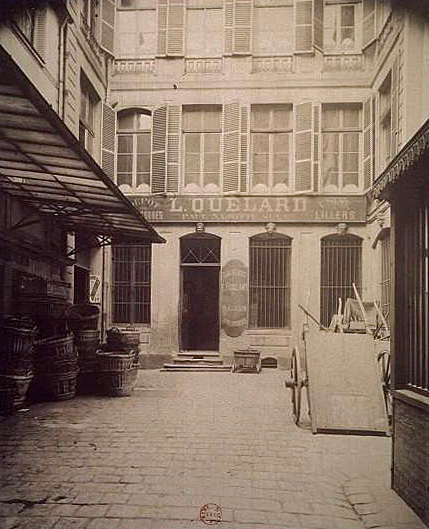
Inner courtyard

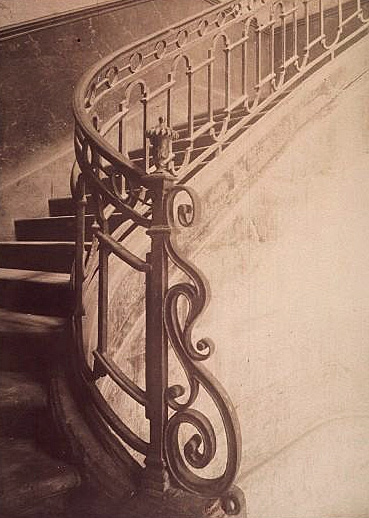
Staircase

It was listed in the Inventory of Historical Monuments by Ministerial order on February 12, 1925 for its street and courtyard façades. Despite this protection, the building was abandoned in the 1970s.

=== Théâtre Les Déchargeurs ===
The hôtel was taken over by Vicky Messica in 1979, who converted it into a theater. After his death in 1998, Lee Fou Messica, his wife, and Ludovic Michel succeeded him.

On October 4, 2001, the street and courtyard rooftops, as well as the monumental staircase and its 18th-century enclosure located in the main courtyard at the end of the left wing, were also classified as a Monument historique.

To finance its renovation, the theater offered the public the opportunity to "adopt a seat" in 2014.

Élisabeth Bouchaud, owner of La Reine Blanche, took over the venue in June 2018, followed by Adrien Grassard on February 12, 2021. On August 2, 2023, Adrien Grassard announced on Facebook the theatre was filing for bankruptcy and immediate cessation of all programming. The real estate group Holfim, now owner of the venue, had negotiated a reduction in the lease amid controversy with employees. A petition of support was launched by companies accommodated at the venue. Aurélie Filippetti, director of culture for the City of Paris, indicated that the city hall is "studying all possibilities to help the theater."
