= Théâtre Louvois =

Coordinates: 48.868361°N 2.337218°E

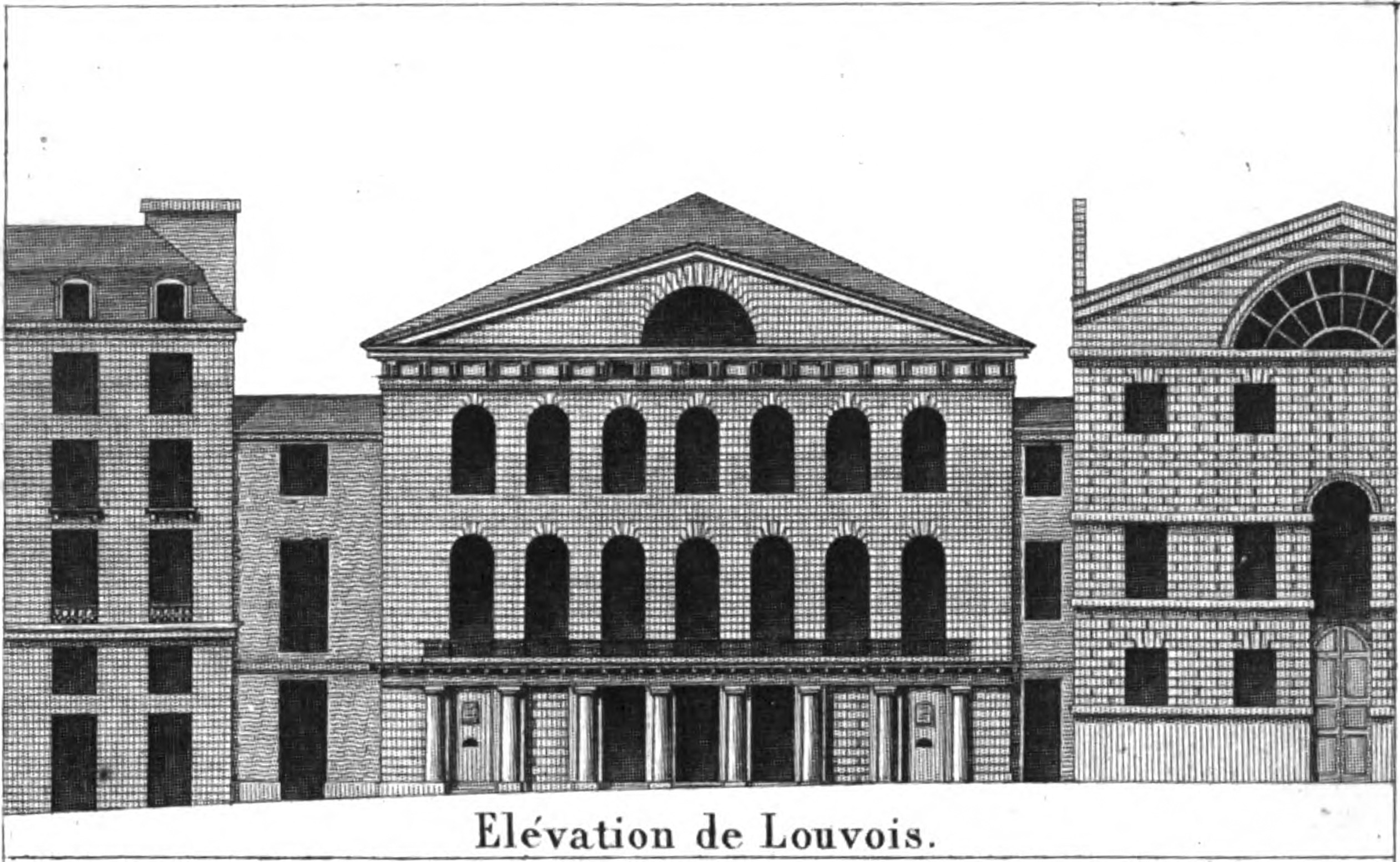
Facade elevation of the theatre in 1821

The Théâtre Louvois (French pronunciation: [teɑtʁ luvwa]) or Salle Louvois ([sal luvwa]) was a theatre located at what is today 8 rue de Louvois in the 2nd arrondissement of Paris. Inaugurated in 1791 and closed in 1825, it was used by the Théâtre-Italien from 20 March 1819 to 8 November 1825. Gioachino Rossini became Director of Music on 1 December 1824.

== History ==
- 1791–1794: building by Francescal on plans by Alexandre-Théodore Brongniart; inauguration on 16 August; known as the Théâtre de Louvois or Théâtre de la rue de Louvois up to January 1794, under the direction of Michel-André Delomel
- 1794–1796: known as the Théâtre des Amis de la Patrie from 13 January 1794 to December 1796
- 1796: direction Mlle Raucourt, as the Théâtre Français de la rue de Louvois' from 25 December 1796 to 10 September 1797
- 1798: direction César Ribié, as the Théâtre d'Émulation from 17 April to 31 December
- 1799: used by the players of the Théâtre de l'Odéon from 20 March to 12 April, under the direction Louis-Benoît Picard
- 1799–1801: known as the Théâtre des Troubadours from 1 August 1799 – 20 April 1801
- 1801–1808: used again from 5 May 1801 – 12 June 1808 by the players of the Théâtre de l'Odéon under Picard, then Alexandre Duval
- 1804: becomes known as the Théâtre de l'Impératrice until June 1808, when the players returned to the new Odéon, taking the name with them
- 1807: acquired in December by the state for use by the Paris Opéra as rehearsal space and for concerts, including some by the Concerts Spirituels
- 1808: closed by order of Napoléon, it then served as a storage room for the Opéra, at that time performing in the Théâtre des Arts located just across the rue de Louvois from the Salle Louvois; communication between the two buildings was via an iron bridge over the rue de Louvois
- 1811–1812: an annex was constructed for the storage of scenery
- 1819–1825: primary venue of the Théâtre-Italien
- 1821: after the closing of the Salle Favart, the theatre was used as an opera house by the Opéra, while the company was awaiting the completion of the Salle Le Peletier. The company gave a concert on 25 May and performed operas on 1 and 15 June. Both opera performances included Rousseau's Le devin du village, and the second also featured the premiere of Adalbert Gyrowetz's divertissement La fête hongroise.
- 1825: closing of the theatre
- 1827: order issued to remove all stored scenery for the sale of the theatre
- 1899: demolition

== Architectural drawings of 1821 ==
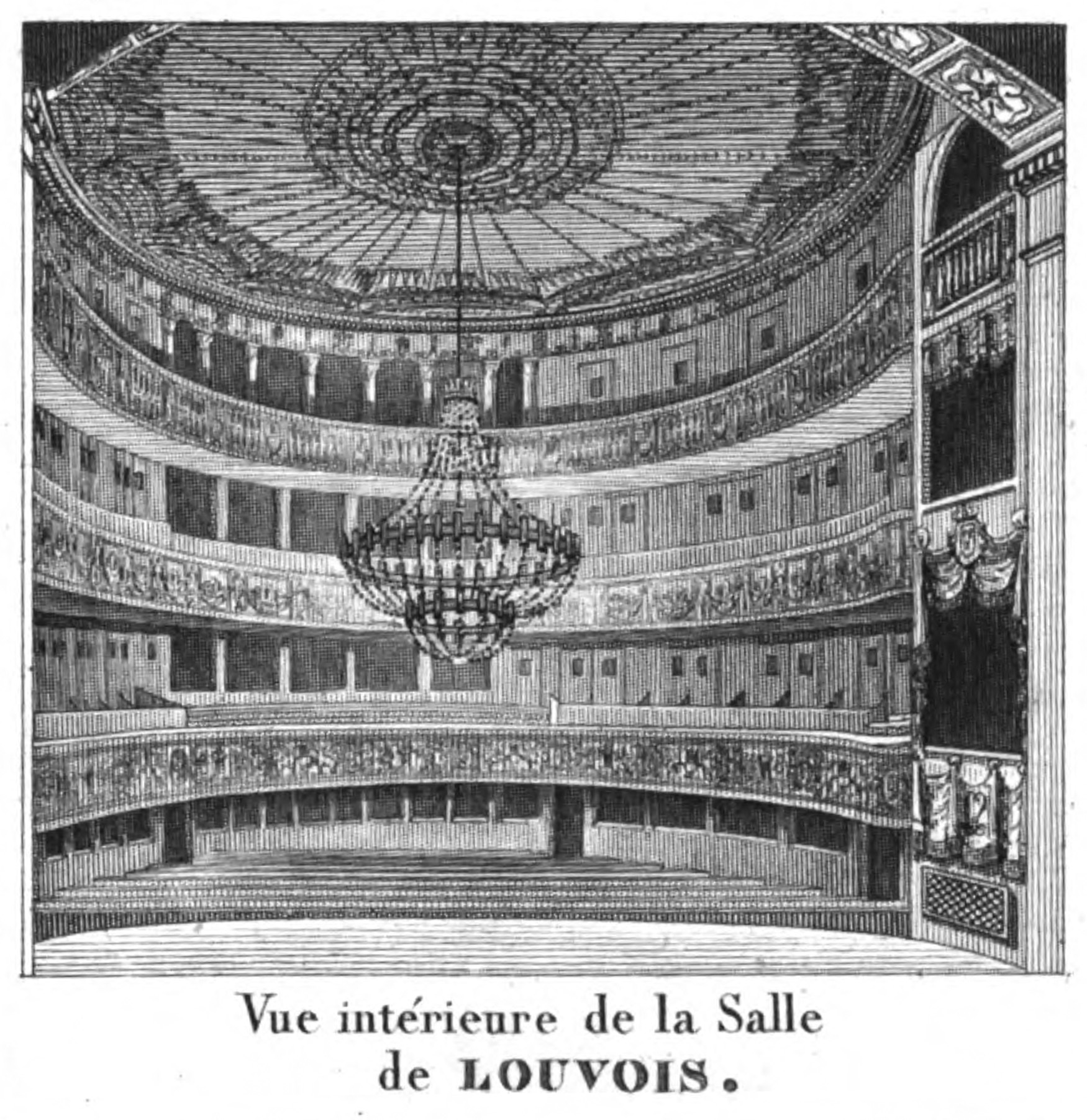
View of the auditorium

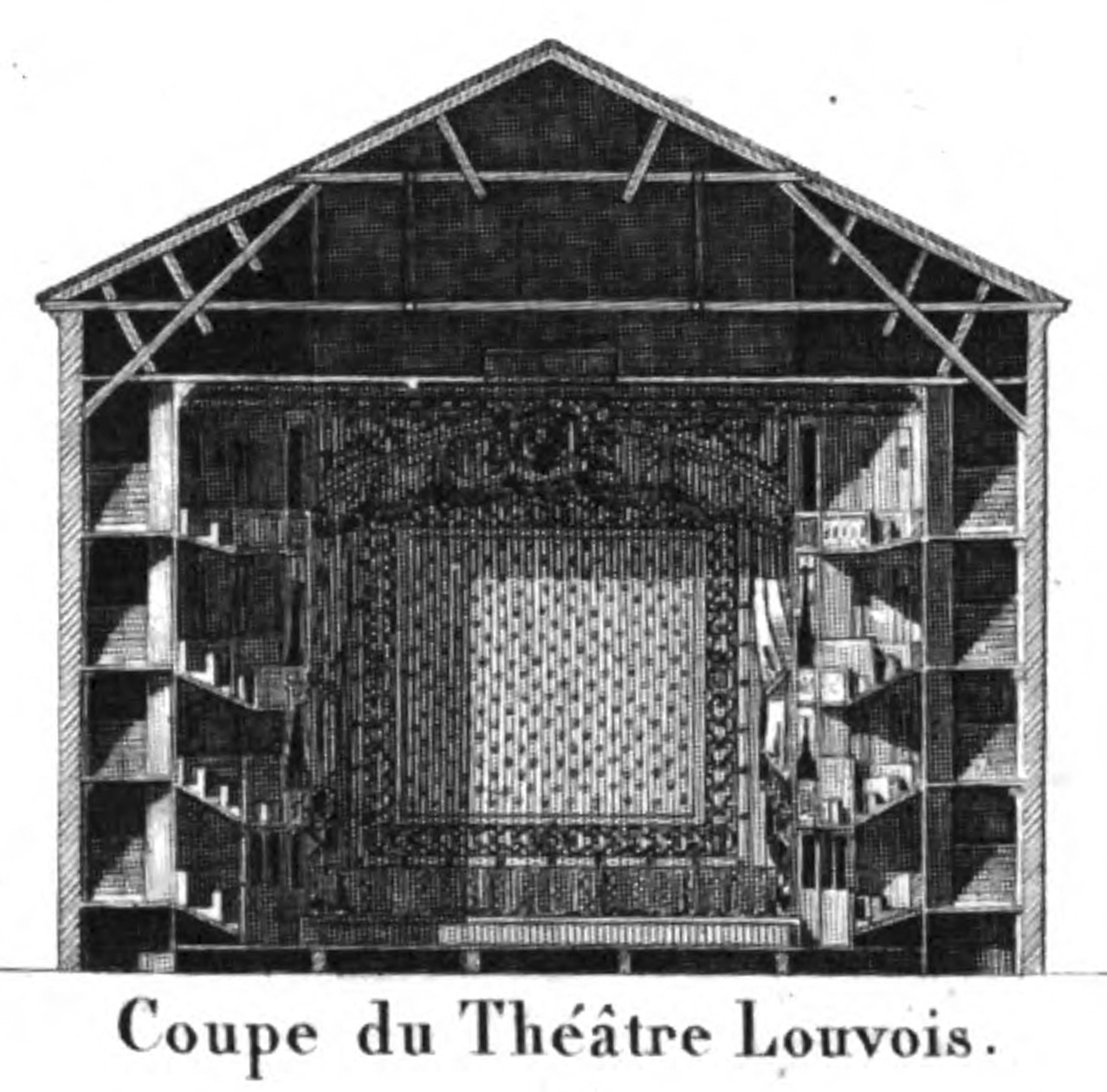
Transverse section

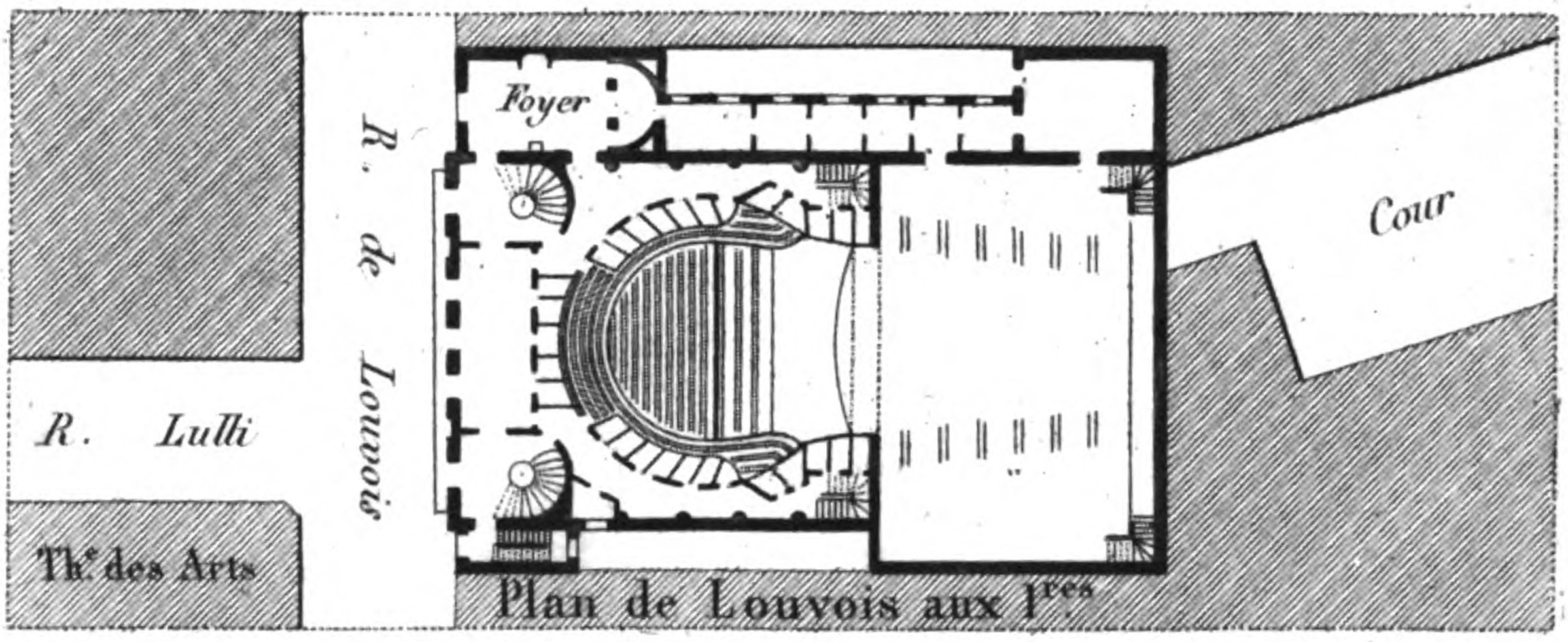
Plan

== See also ==
- List of former or demolished entertainment venues in Paris

== Bibliography ==
- Donnet, Alexis; Orgiazzi, J. (1821). Architectonographie des théâtres de Paris, plates volume, plate 12. Paris: Didot l'ainé. Scanned by Google Books. Credit: Princeton University Library.
- Hillairet, Jacques (1985). Dictionnaire historique des rues de Paris, vol. 2, 8th edition, Les Éditions de minuit, 1985, ISBN 2-7073-1054-9
- Johnson, Janet (1992). "Paris, 4: 1789–1870 (v) Théâtre-Italien", vol. 3, p. 870–871, in The New Grove Dictionary of Opera, edited by Stanley Sadie. New York: Grove, ISBN 9781561592289. Also at Oxford Music Online (subscription required).
- Lasalle, Albert de (1875). Les Treize Salles de l'Opéra, librairie Sartorius, 1875 (chapter X: Salle Favart (1820), p. 234)
- Pitou, Spire (1983). The Paris Opéra: An Encyclopedia of Operas, Ballets, Composers, and Performers. Genesis and Glory, 1671–1715. Westport, Connecticut: Greenwood Press. ISBN 9780313214202
- Wild, Nicole (1989). Dictionnaire des théâtres parisiens au XIXe siècle: les théâtres et la musique. Paris: Aux Amateurs de livres. ISBN 9780828825863, ISBN 9782905053800 (paperback). OCLC 20954302 (complete list of all editions)
