= Théâtre ChoChotte =

Theatre in Paris, France

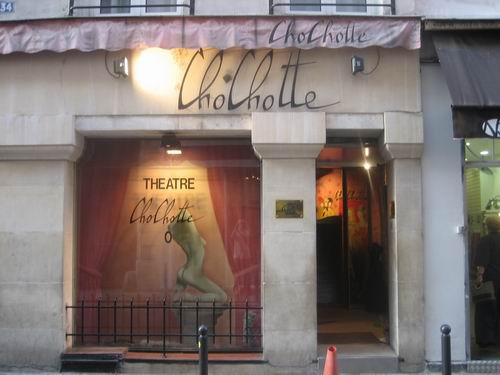
- View of Théâtre ChoChotte
- Interactive map of Théâtre ChoChotte
- Address: 34 rue Saint-André-des-Arts; 6th arrondissement of Paris; Paris; France
- Coordinates: 48°51′12″N 2°20′31″E
- Type: Erotic theatre
- Public transit: Odéon, Saint-Michel, Saint-Michel–Notre-Dame, 58, 63, 70, 86, 24, 27, 38, 85, 96

Construction
- Opened: 1986

Website
- www.theatre-chochotte.fr www.theatre-chochotte.com

The Théâtre ChoChotte was inaugurated in 1986 by Madame Caussade, who was an artist and an entrepreneur, and also a designer of haute couture whose shop was located at the current address of the theater. Since it was created, the theatre has always been a Parisian erotic performance hall located at 34 rue Saint-André-des-Arts, in the 6th arrondissement of Paris.

== History ==
Until 1986, the ChoChotte theater hall was an haute couture shop in which Madame Caussade used to receive her customers.

After having spent her entire career dressing women with her creations, Madame Caussade decided, from 1986, to offer her customers, and women in general, a place no longer to come and dress, but to undress, and thus she transformed her shop into a performance hall in which new erotic shows are created every week.

The establishment has been the subject of media reports.

== Written press ==
- April 2019: Press article in the French magazine entitled Paris Nuit
- February 2017: Les déesses de la fesse, press article in the French magazine entitled Soixante-Quinze
- 2017: Théâtre Chochotte, press article in the French magazine entitled TéléObs Paris Dernière
- June 2003: Ma nuit chez Chochotte, press article in the French magazine entitled Senso n°9 published in May/June 2003
- 2012: Dossier Chochotte, press article in the French magazine L'imparfaite n°4 published in summer 2012
- February 2008: press article in the French magazine entitled France NewsDigest n°849 published on 7 February 2008
- Art book entitled Paris Derrière – Les clés de l'érotisme à Paris dedicated to the ChoChotte theater

== TV broadcast ==
- 10 May 2014: Broadcast entitled Spectacle érotique chez Chochotte in TV report entitled Paris Dernière broadcast on Paris Première French TV channel
- 13 December 2014: Broadcast entitled Soirée érotique et burlesque au théâtre Chochotte in TV report entitled Paris Dernière broadcast on Paris Première French TV channel
- 23 November 2007: TV show entitled Paris Dernière n°9(5) broadcast on Paris Première French TV channel, Season n°10
- Que se passe-t-il la nuit ?, TV report entitled Je t’aime etc. broadcast on France 2 French TV channel
- 5 December 2002: TV report entitled L'Oeil de Zara
- 21 September 2001: TV report entitled L'Oeil de Zara
- 26 December 2000: TV show entitled Hot talk n°132 broadcast on XXL French TV channel
- 8 June 1996: TV show entitled Paris Dernière n°37 broadcast on Paris Première French TV channel
- 23 December 1995: TV show entitled Paris Dernière n°13 broadcast on Paris Première French TV channel
- TV report entitled Combien ça coûte presented by Jean-Pierre Pernaut
