= La Comédie Italienne =

French theatre company

Coordinates: 48.840085°N 2.324050°E

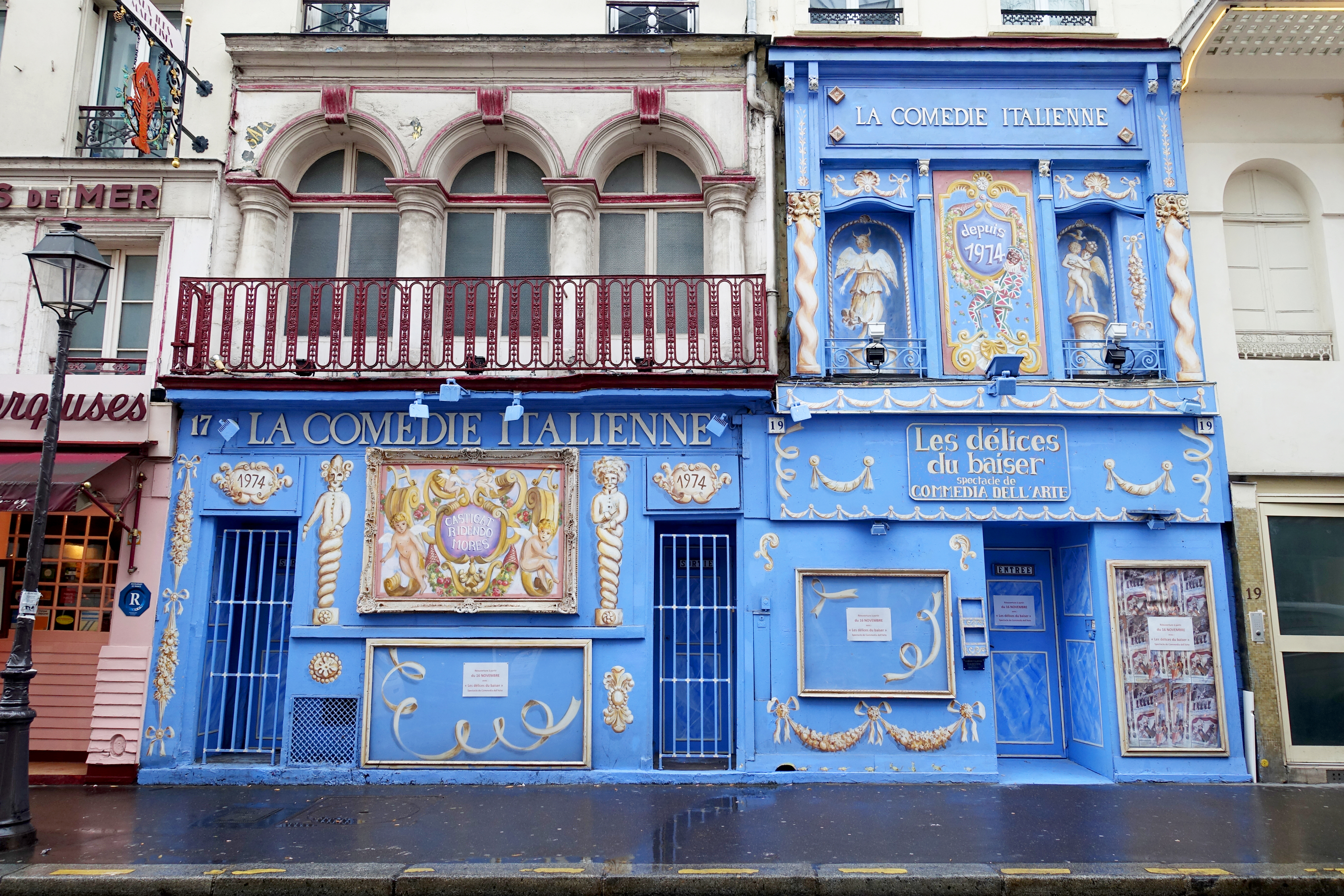
Théâtre de la Comédie Italienne

La Comédie Italienne (French pronunciation: [la kɔmedi italjɛn]) is a theatre in the Montparnasse district of Paris, presenting Italian commedia dell'arte plays in French translation.

The present-day Comédie Italienne is situated at 19 rue de la Gaîté, where it was established in 1980 by the director Attilio Maggiulli, after the closing of his Teatrino Italiano, founded in 1975 on the avenue du Maine. The Comédie Italienne remains the only Italian theatre in France and performs exclusively plays by Italian writers, classic and contemporary, in French translation.

== Sources ==
- Forman, Edward (2010). Historical Dictionary of French Theater. Lanham: The Scarecrow Press. ISBN 9780810849396.
