= Rue de la Gaîté =

Street in Paris, France

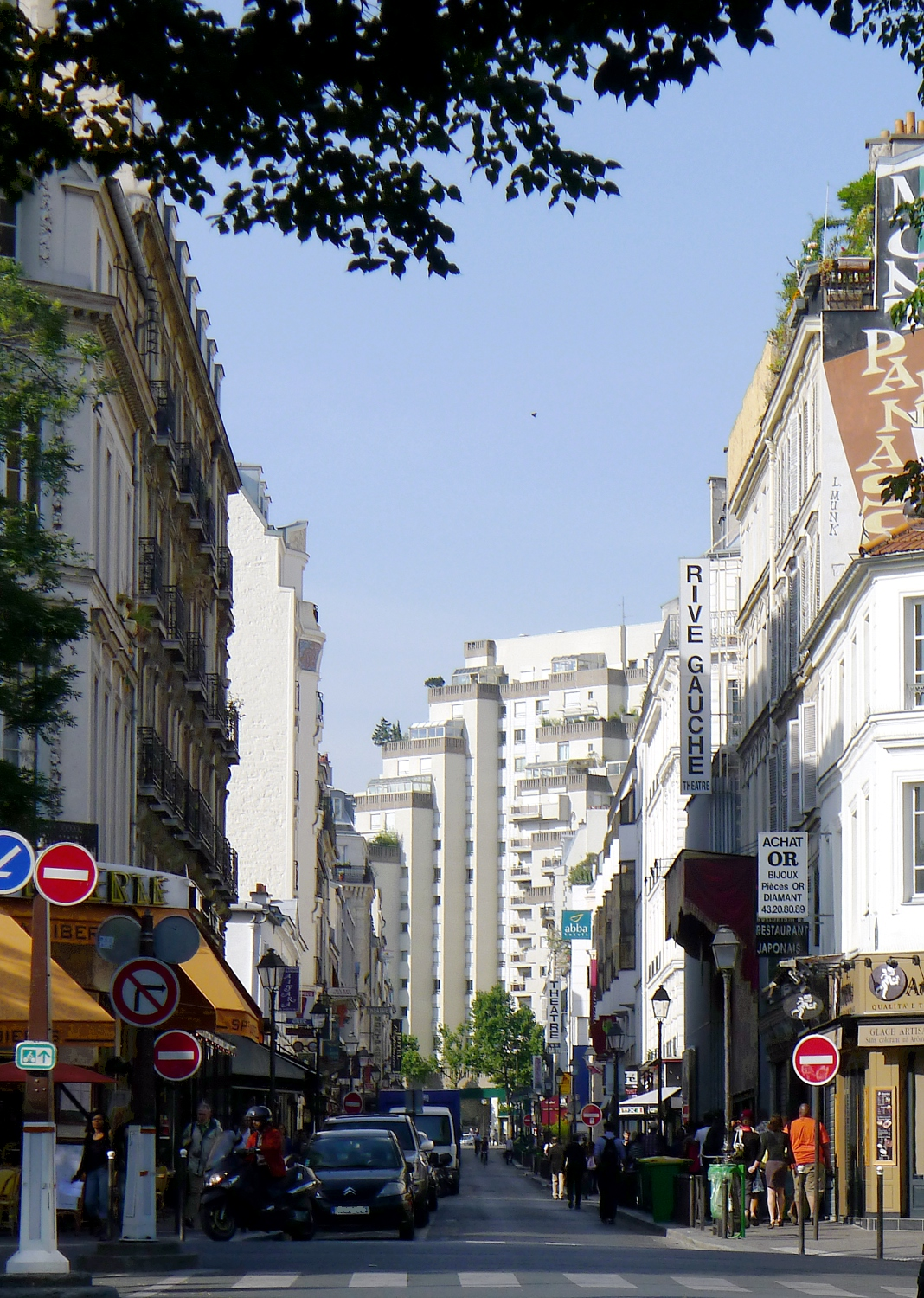
- Rue de la Gaîté seen from Boulevard Edgar-Quinet
- Interactive map of Rue de la Gaîté
- Namesake: The amusement halls and theatres built on the road
- Length: 430 metres (1,411 ft)
- Width: 12 metres (39 ft)
- Arrondissement: 14th
- Quarter: Montparnasse
- Major junctions: Avenue du Maine, Boulevard Edgar-Quinet

The Rue de la Gaîté is a street located in the 14th arrondissement of Paris in the Montparnasse district, known for its theatres and other entertainment venues.

== History ==
In 1730 the Rue de la Gaîté was a country road in the commune of Montrouge, outside the walls of Paris.

Rue de la Gaîté as seen from Avenue du Maine

It was still outside the boundaries of Paris in 1819 and retained its rural character, being lined with acacia trees and by that time also with guinguettes where workers went to drink and dance on Sundays and Mondays in places of pleasure and gaiety that gave the street its name.

The area was absorbed into Paris in 1860 and incorporated into the Paris road network on 23 May 1863.

The street continued to develop as a locale for entertainment venues. An article in La Rampe in April 1916 described it as a short but lively street offering a range of entertainments with something for everyone: "theatre, concert, music hall, cinema". (Note: Le public de la rive gauche est favorisé, il se dirige sans hésiter rue de la Gaîté e là, il n’a que l’embarras du choix. À chaque porte de cette courte rue, mais animée, oh combien ! il y a un spectacle : théâtre, concert, music-hall, cinéma, il y en a pour tous les goûts. (La Rampe, 20 April 1916))

== Entertainment venues ==
The street has been home to many entertainment venues, some of the best-known of which are:

- At number 6, the café-concert Gangloff operated in the 19th century. The site later became the Gaîté-Palace cinema and is now occupied by the Théâtre Rive Gauche.

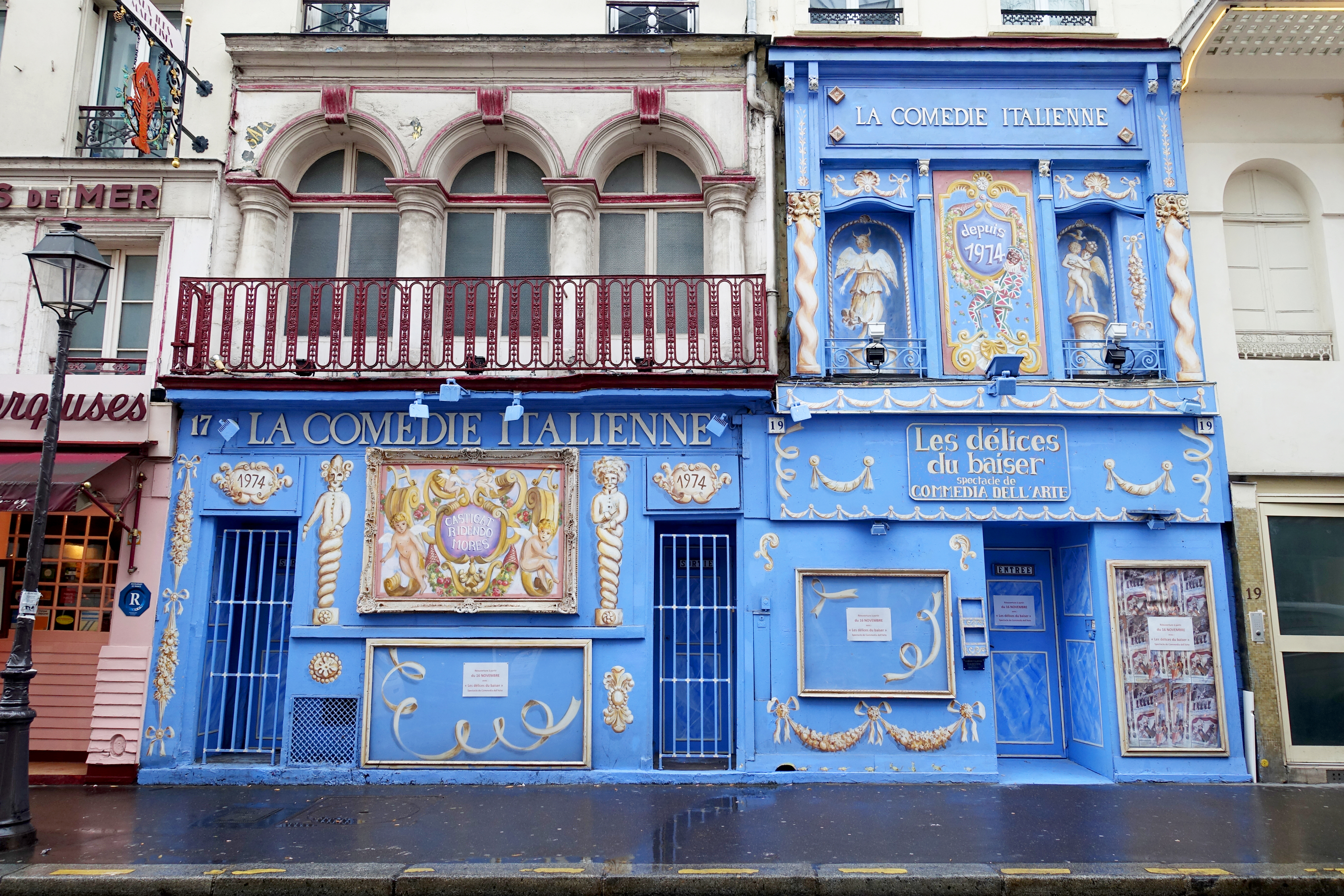
Frontage of the Comédie-Italienne at number 19

- At number 19 is the Comédie-Italienne, a theatre founded in 1975 and transferred to Rue de la Gaîté in 1980.
- At number 20, the site became associated with Bobino. The Théâtre des Folies-Bobino, successor to the Théâtre du Luxembourg, was established there in 1873, and the venue subsequently became a music hall. The original building was demolished in 1985 and replaced by the Studio Bobino; in 2007, the venue was converted into a cabaret known as Bobin'O.
- At number 20 bis, the Mille-Colonnes operated from 1833 to 1991 as a café, restaurant, cinema and entertainment venue.

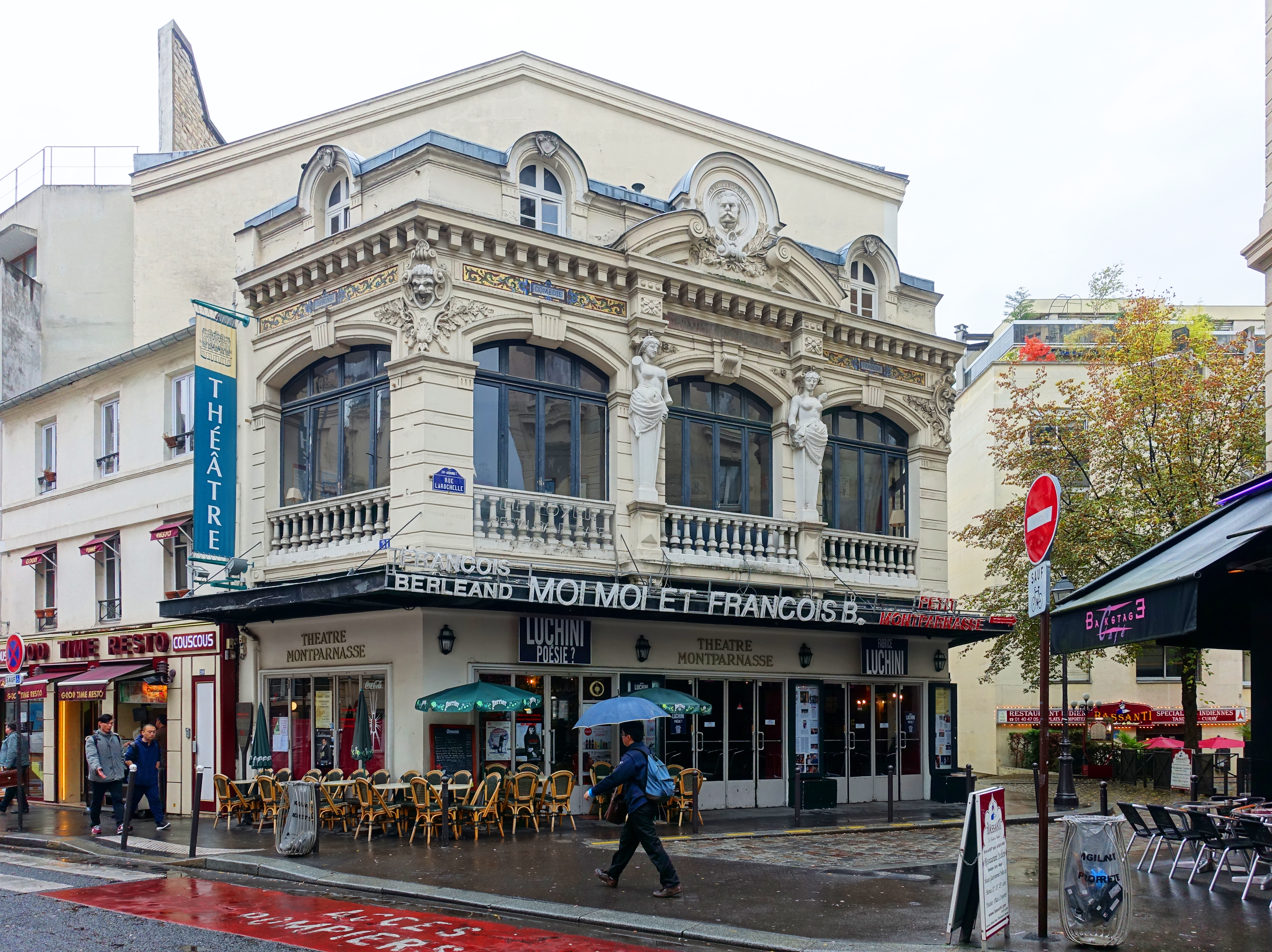
Théâtre Montparnasse at number 26 (2016)

- At number 26, the Théâtre Montparnasse, now a monument historique, opened in 1886.
