= Nabucco =

1842 opera by Giuseppe Verdi

- Opera by Giuseppe Verdi
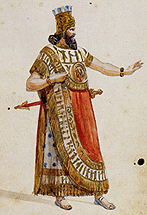
- Costume sketch for Nabucco for the original production
- Librettist: Temistocle Solera
- Language: Italian
- Based on: Play by Auguste Anicet-Bourgeois and Francis Cornu, as well as Antonio Cortese's ballet adaptation
- Premiere: 9 March 1842; La Scala, Milan

Nabucco (Italian pronunciation: [naˈbukko]; short for Nabucodonosor [naˌbukoˈdɔːnozor, -donoˈzɔr], i.e. "Nebuchadnezzar") is an Italian-language opera in four acts composed in 1841 by Giuseppe Verdi to an Italian libretto by Temistocle Solera. The libretto is based on the biblical books of 2 Kings, Jeremiah, Lamentations, and Daniel, and on the 1836 play by Auguste Anicet-Bourgeois and Francis Cornu. However, Antonio Cortese's ballet adaptation of the play (with its necessary simplifications), given at La Scala in 1836, was a more important source for Solera than the play itself. Under its original name of Nabucodonosor, the opera was first performed at La Scala in Milan on the 9th of March 1842.

Nabucco is the opera that is considered to have permanently established Verdi's reputation as a composer. He commented that "this is the opera with which my artistic career really begins. And though I had many difficulties to fight against, it is certain that Nabucco was born under a lucky star."

The opera follows the plight of the Jews as they are assaulted, conquered and subsequently exiled from their homeland by the Babylonian king Nabucco (Nebuchadnezzar II). The historical events are used as background for a romantic and political plot. The best-known number from the opera is the "Chorus of the Hebrew Slaves" ("Va, pensiero, sull'ali dorate" / "Fly, thought, on golden wings"), a chorus that is regularly given an encore in many opera houses when performed today.

== Composition history ==
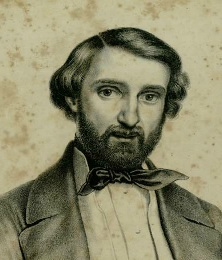
Giuseppe Verdi, lithograph by Roberto Focosi, c. 1840

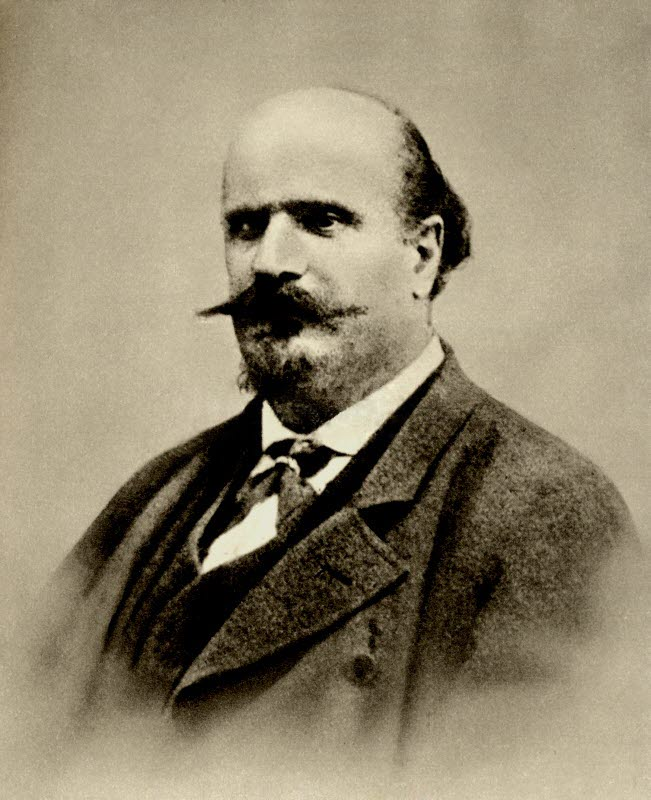
Librettist Temistocle Solera

The success of Verdi's first opera, Oberto, led Bartolomeo Merelli, La Scala's impresario, to offer Verdi a contract for three more works. After the failure of his second opera Un giorno di regno (completed in 1840 towards the end of a brutal two-year period during which both of his infant children and then his 26-year-old wife died), Verdi vowed never to compose again.

In "An Autobiographical Sketch", written in 1879, Verdi tells the story of how he came to be twice persuaded by Merelli to change his mind and to write the opera. The duration of 38 years since the event may have led to a somewhat romanticized view; or, as Verdi scholar Julian Budden writes: "he was concerned to weave a protective legend about himself [since] it was all part of his fierce independence of spirit." However, in Volere è potere ("Where there's a will ...") – written ten years closer to the event – the zoologist Michele Lessona provides a different account of the events, as allegedly recounted by Verdi himself.

After a chance meeting with Merelli close to La Scala, the impresario gave him a copy of Temistocle Solera's libretto which had been rejected by the composer Otto Nicolai. Verdi describes how he took it home, and threw "it on the table with an almost violent gesture. ... In falling, it had opened of itself; without my realising it, my eyes clung to the open page and to one special line: 'Va, pensiero, sull'ali dorate'."

It has been noted that "Verdi read it enthusiastically" (and he himself mentioned that, while trying to sleep, he was kept awake and read and re-read the libretto three times), while others have suggested that he read it very reluctantly or, as recounted by Lessona, that he "threw the libretto in a corner without looking at it anymore, and for the next five months he carried on with his reading of bad novels ... [when] towards the end of May he found himself with that blessed play in his hands: he read the last scene over again, the one with the death of Abigaille (which was later cut), seated himself almost mechanically at the piano ... and set the scene to music."

Nevertheless, Verdi still refused to compose the music, taking the manuscript back to the impresario the next day. But Merelli would not accept the refusal; he immediately stuffed the papers back into Verdi's pocket and according to the composer, "not only threw me out of his office, but slammed the door in my face and locked himself in". Verdi claims that gradually he worked on the music: "This verse today, tomorrow that, here a note, there a whole phrase, and little by little the opera was written" so that by the autumn of 1841 it was complete. At the very least, both Verdi's and Lessona's versions end with a complete score.

== Performance history ==
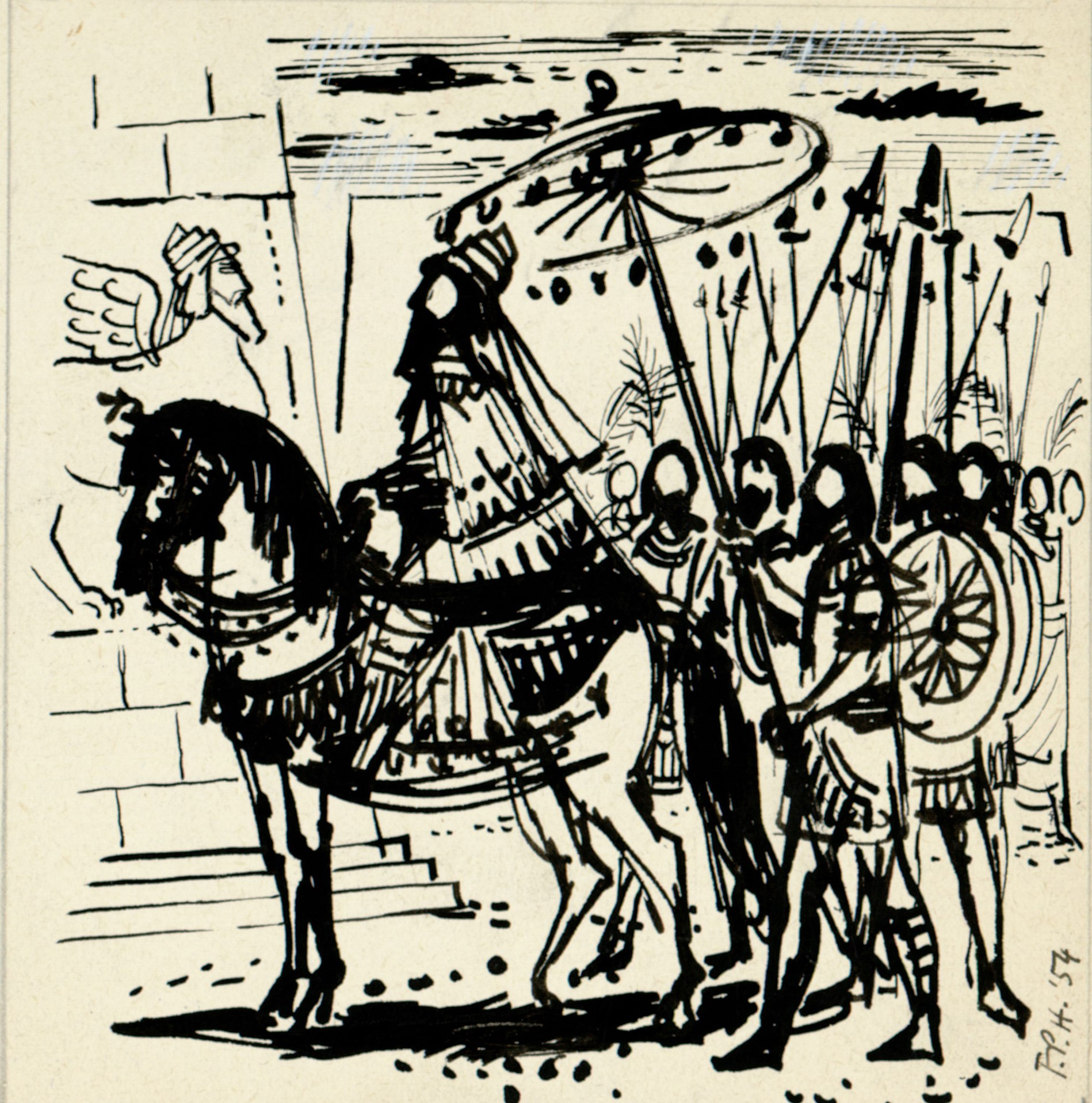
Drawing for libretto of Nabucco (1954)

=== 19th century ===
The opening performances, limited to only eight because the season was coming to an end, were "a colossal success." But, when the new season opened on 13 August 1842, around 60 performances had been added by the end of that year. Numerous Italian and foreign theatres put on this opera in the years immediately following, including La Fenice in Venice in December 1842. In 1843, Donizetti conducted it in Vienna, and other stagings took place that year in Lisbon and Cagliari. But the definitive name of Nabucco for the opera (and its protagonist) was first used at a performance at the San Giacomo Theatre of Corfu in September 1844. Nonetheless, a more plausible alternative for the establishment of this abbreviated form claims that it was the result of a revival of the opera in Teatro del Giglio of Lucca.

The opera was first given in London at Her Majesty's Theatre on 3 March 1846 under the name of Nino, since the depiction of biblical characters on stage "was not considered proper". In the US it appeared at the Astor Opera House in New York on 4 April 1848.

=== 20th century and beyond ===
Nabucco is frequently heard around the world today. It has been on the Metropolitan Opera's roster since it was first presented there during the 1960/61 season. When the Metropolitan opened its season in September 2001, eleven days after the destruction of the World Trade Center, the chorus began by singing "Va, pensiero" in honor of the victims of the attack.

Nabucco is also regularly performed at the Arena di Verona. Among the performances preserved on DVD are those at the Arena di Verona (1981 and 2007); La Scala (1987), Opera Australia (1996), Vienna State Opera (2001), Metropolitan Opera (2002), Genoa's Teatro Carlo Felice (2004), Teatro Municipale di Piacenza (2004), and Austria's St. Margarethen Opera Festival (2007).

Many other companies have also performed it, including San Francisco Opera in 1982, Sarasota Opera in 1995 and 2019, London's Royal Opera House in 1996, Lyric Opera of Chicago in 1997 and 2016, the New National Theatre Tokyo in 1998, Teatro Colón in 2000, Baltimore Opera in 2006, and the Teatro Regio di Parma in 2008 as part of their on-going "Festival Verdi". Nabucco was presented by the Michigan Opera Theatre and the San Diego Opera as part of their 2009–2010 seasons. The Israeli Opera celebrated its 25th anniversary in 2010 with Nabucco at Masada, and performed it again in June 2019, accompanied by the Jerusalem Symphony Orchestra, in the Sultan's Pool, just outside the wall surrounding the Old City of Jerusalem. It was performed at the Royal Opera House, Covent Garden in 1972 with Colin Davis, and in March 2013 with director Daniele Abbado for a new co-production with La Scala, which was relayed to cinemas and subsequently released on DVD. Seattle Opera produced its first-ever staging of Nabucco in August 2015.

== Roles ==
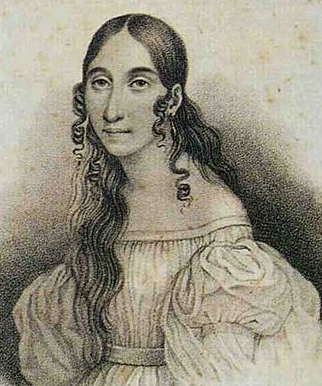
Soprano Giuseppina Strepponi, the first Abigaille, c. 1840

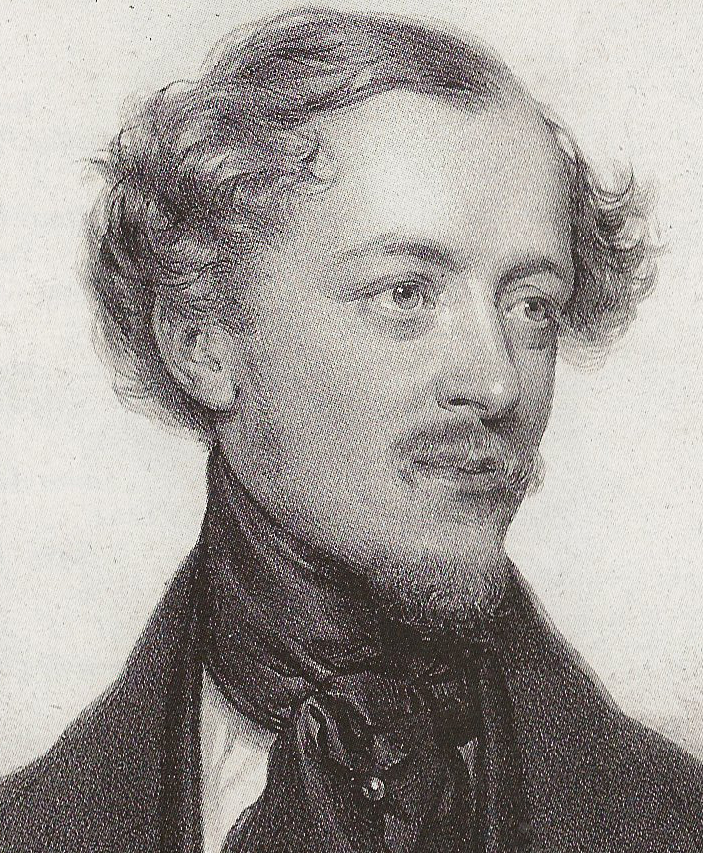
Baritone Giorgio Ronconi who sang the title role

Roles, voice types, premiere cast
Role	Voice type	Premiere cast, 9 March 1842 Conductor: Eugenio Cavallini
Nabucco, King of Babylon	baritone	Giorgio Ronconi
Abigaille, supposedly his elder daughter	soprano	Giuseppina Strepponi
Fenena, his daughter	mezzo-soprano	Giovannina Bellinzaghi
Ismaele, nephew of Zedekiah, the King of Jerusalem	tenor	Corrado Miraglia
Zaccaria, high priest of the Jews	bass	Prosper Dérivis
Anna, Zaccaria's sister	soprano	Teresa Ruggeri
Abdallo, Babylonian soldier	tenor	Napoleone Marconi
High priest of Baal	bass	Gaetano Rossi
People, soldiers

== Instrumentation ==
Nabucco is scored for two flutes (one doubling piccolo), two oboes (one doubling English horn), two clarinets, two bassoons, four horns, two trumpets, three trombones (two tenor, one bass), one cimbasso, timpani, bass drum, cymbals, side drum, triangle, two harps, strings, and an onstage banda.

== Synopsis ==
Time: 587 BC
Place: Jerusalem and Babylon

=== Act 1: Jerusalem ===
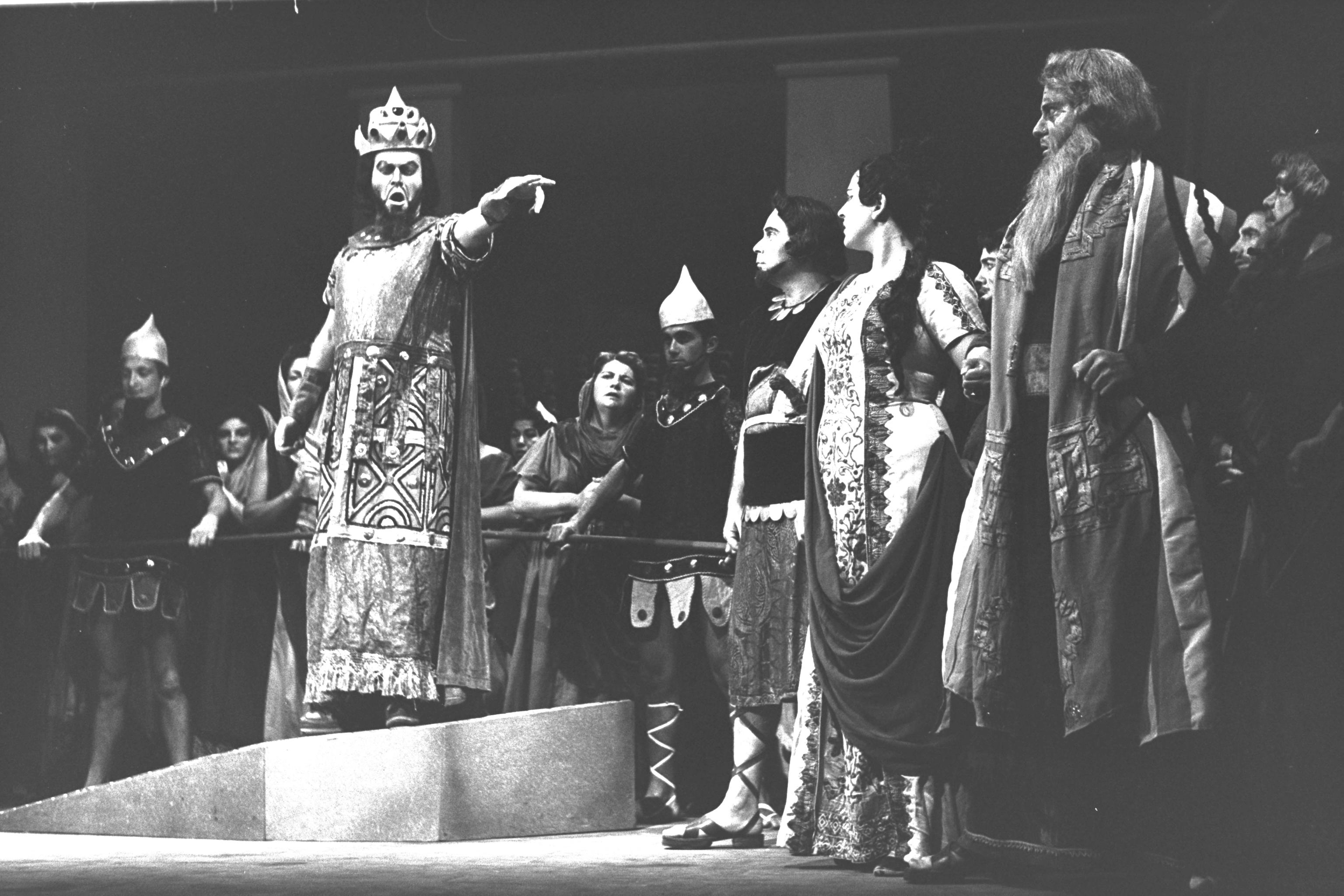
A scene from act 1

'Thus saith the Lord, Behold, I shall deliver this city into the hand of the King of Babylon, and he will burn it with fire' (Jeremiah 21:10)

Interior of the Temple of Solomon

The Israelites pray as the Babylonian army advances on their city ("Gli arredi festivi giù cadano infranti" / "Throw down and destroy all festive decorations"). The High Priest Zaccaria tells the people not to despair but to trust in God ("D'Egitto là su i lidi" / "On the shores of Egypt He saved the life of Moses"). The presence of a hostage, Fenena, younger daughter of Nabucco, King of Babylon, may yet secure peace ("Come notte a sol fulgente" / "Like darkness before the sun"). Zaccaria entrusts Fenena to Ismaele, nephew of the King of Jerusalem and a former envoy to Babylon. Left alone, Fenena and Ismaele recall how they fell in love when Ismaele was held prisoner by the Babylonians, and how Fenena helped him to escape to Israel. Nabucco's supposed elder daughter, Abigaille, enters the temple with Babylonian soldiers in disguise. She, too, loves Ismaele. Discovering the lovers, she threatens Ismaele: if he does not give up Fenena, Abigaille will accuse her of treason. If Ismaele returns Abigaille's love, however, Abigaille will petition Nabucco on the Israelites' behalf. Ismaele tells Abigaille that he cannot love her and she vows revenge. Nabucco enters with his warriors ("Viva Nabucco" / "Long live Nabucco"). Zaccaria defies him, threatening to kill Fenena if Nabucco attacks the temple. Ismaele intervenes to save Fenena, which removes any impediment from Nabucco destroying the temple. He orders this, while Zaccaria and the Israelites curse Ismaele as a traitor.

=== Act 2: The Impious One ===
'Behold, the whirlwind of the Lord goeth forth, it shall fall upon the head of the wicked' (Jeremiah 30:23)

Scene 1: Royal apartments in Babylon

Nabucco has appointed Fenena regent and guardian of the Israelite prisoners, while he continues the battle against the Israelites. Abigaille has discovered a document that proves she is not Nabucco's real daughter, but the daughter of slaves. She reflects bitterly on Nabucco's refusal to allow her to play a role in the war with the Israelites and recalls past happiness ("Anch'io dischiuso un giorno" / "I too once opened my heart to happiness"). The High Priest of Baal informs Abigaille that Fenena has released the Israelite captives. He plans for Abigaille to become ruler of Babylon, and with this intention has spread the rumour that Nabucco has died in battle. Abigaille determines to seize the throne ("Salgo già del trono aurato" / "I already ascend the golden throne").

Scene 2: A room in the palace

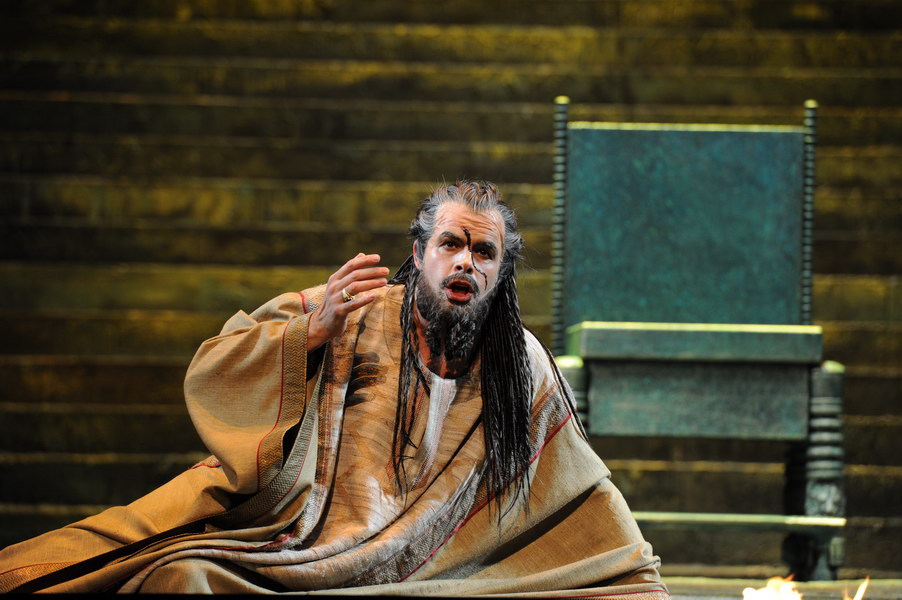
Nabucco's mad scene with Bastiaan Everink in the title role

Zaccaria reads over the Tablets of Law ("Vieni, o Levita" / "Come, oh Levite!"), then goes to summon Fenena. A group of Levites accuse Ismaele of treachery. Zaccaria returns with Fenena and his sister Anna. Anna tells the Levites that Fenena has converted to Judaism, and urges them to forgive Ismaele. Abdallo, a soldier, announces the death of Nabucco and warns of the rebellion instigated by Abigaille. Abigaille enters with the High Priest of Baal and demands the crown from Fenena. Unexpectedly, Nabucco himself enters; pushing through the crowd, he seizes the crown and declares himself not only king of the Babylonians but also their god. The high priest Zaccaria curses him and warns of divine vengeance; an incensed Nabucco in turn orders the death of the Israelites. Fenena reveals to him that she has embraced the Jewish religion and will share the Israelites' fate. Nabucco is furious and repeats his conviction that he is now divine ("Non son più re, son dio" / "I am no longer King! I am God!"). A crashing thunderbolt strikes Nabucco down, and he promptly loses his senses. The crown falls from his head and is picked up by Abigaille, who pronounces herself ruler of the Babylonians.

=== Act 3: The Prophecy ===
'Therefore the wild beasts of the desert with the wild beasts of the islands shall dwell there, and the owls shall dwell therein' (Jeremiah 50:39)

Scene 1: The Hanging Gardens of Babylon

Abigaille is now Queen of Babylon. The High Priest of Baal presents her with the death warrant for the Israelites, as well as for Fenena. Nabucco, still insane, tries to reclaim the throne without success. Though his consent to the death warrant is no longer necessary, Abigaille tricks him into signing it. When Nabucco learns that he has consigned his (true) daughter to death, he is overcome with grief and anger. He tells Abigaille that he is not in fact her father and searches for the document evidencing her true origins as a slave. Abigaille mocks him, produces the document and tears it up. Realizing his powerlessness, Nabucco pleads for Fenena's life ("Oh di qual onta aggravasi questo mio crin canuto" / "Oh, what shame must my old head suffer"). Abigaille is unmoved and orders Nabucco to leave her.

Scene 2: The banks of the River Euphrates

The Israelites long for their homeland ("Va, pensiero, sull'ali dorate" / "Fly, thought, on golden wings"). The high priest Zaccaria once again exhorts them to have faith: God will destroy Babylon. The Israelites are inspired by his words.

=== Act 4: The Broken Idol ===
'Bel is confounded, Merodach is broken to pieces; her idols are confounded, her images are broken in pieces.' (Jeremiah 50:2)

Scene 1: Royal apartments in Babylon

Nabucco awakens, still confused and raving. He sees Fenena in chains being taken to her death. In despair, he prays to the God of the Hebrews. He asks for forgiveness, and promises to rebuild the temple in Jerusalem and convert to Judaism if his prayers are answered ("Dio di Giuda" / "God of Judah!"). Miraculously, his strength and reason are immediately restored. Abdallo and loyal soldiers enter to release him. Nabucco resolves to rescue Fenena and the Israelites as well as to punish the traitors.

Scene 2: The Hanging Gardens of Babylon

Fenena and the Israelite prisoners are led in to be sacrificed (orchestral interlude and "Va! La palma del martirio" / "Go, win the palm of martyrdom"). Fenena serenely prepares for death ("O dischiuso è il firmamento" / "O open is the firmament"). Nabucco rushes in with Abdallo and other soldiers. He declares that he will rebuild the Temple of Jerusalem and worship the God of the Israelites, ordering the destruction of the idol of Baal. At his word, the idol falls to the ground of its own accord and shatters into pieces. Nabucco tells the Israelites that they are now free and all join in praise of Jehovah. Abigaille enters, supported by soldiers. She has poisoned herself. She begs forgiveness of Fenena, prays for God's mercy and dies. Zaccaria proclaims Nabucco the servant of God and king of kings.

== Historicity ==
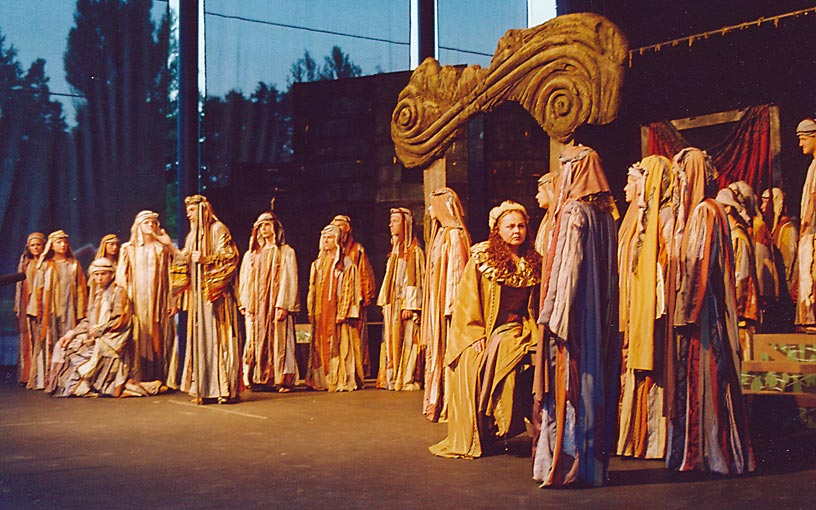
Nabucco in Eberswalde by the Silesian Opera, August 2004

The historical Nebuchadnezzar II (c. 634–562 BC) took Jerusalem in 597 BC, but the madness plot of the opera differs from both archeological and biblical records of him. In the Book of Daniel, his madness lasts for seven years before his conversion to Judaism. But in the opera it only lasts for the time between the order to kill Fenena and the Jews, and it being carried out.

The biblical story of seven years of madness followed by conversion bears more similarity to the Dead Sea Scrolls' story of Nabonidus (556–539 BC), father of Belshazzar in the Cylinders of Nabonidus, than to the historical Nebuchadnezzar. Nabonidus was the last king of Babylon, five kings later than Nebuchadnezzar, and Belshazzar was a temporary regent during Nabonidus' reign.

Historical and biblical records agree that the Jews were freed and their temple was rebuilt not by the Babylonians but by Cyrus the Great following his conquest of Babylon in 539 BC. The opera's Nabucco character is thus a composite of historical and biblical Nebuchadnezzar II, Nabonidus and Cyrus.

Babylonians addressed their own god as "Bel" (Italian: Belo), related to the deity Marduk, who assumed the title of "lord" after his exaltation. The title "Bel" was in fact used also in connection with Nergal.

== Critical reaction ==
The opera was an instant success, dominating Donizetti's and Giovanni Pacini's operas playing nearby. While the public went mad with enthusiasm, the critics tempered their approval of the opera. One critic who found Nabucco revolting was Otto Nicolai, the composer to whom the libretto was first offered. A Prussian, Nicolai felt at odds with emotional Italian opera while he lived near Milan. After refusing to accept the libretto proposal from Merelli, Nicolai began work on another offer called Il Proscritto. Its disastrous premiere in March 1841 forced Nicolai to cancel his contract with Merelli and return to Vienna. From there he learned of the success of Nabucco and was enraged. "Verdi's operas are really horrible," he wrote. "He scores like a fool – technically he is not even professional – and he must have the heart of a donkey and in my view he is a pitiful, despicable composer ... Nabucco is nothing but "rage, invective, bloodshed and murder." However, Nicolai's opinions were in the minority. Nabucco secured Verdi's success.

At the 1845 premiere of the opera in Paris critics complained about the excessive use of brass instruments and this word play epigram appeared:

Vraiment l'affiche est dans son tort,
en faux on devrait la poursuivre.
Pourquoi nous annoncer Nabucodonos-or
quand c'est Nabucodonos-cuivre?

Really the poster is wrong,
It should be indicted for falsehood.
Why to announce a Nabucodonos-or (Note: "or" is French for "gold")
when the question is about Nabucodonos-brass?

Music historians have perpetuated a powerful myth about the famous "Va, pensiero" chorus sung in the third act by the Hebrew slaves. Scholars have long believed the audience, responding with nationalistic fervor to the slaves' powerful hymn of longing for their homeland, demanded an encore of the piece. As encores were expressly forbidden by the Austrian authorities ruling northern Italy at the time to prevent public protests, such a gesture would have been extremely significant. However, recent scholarship puts this and the corresponding myth of "Va, pensiero" as the national anthem of the Risorgimento to rest. Although the audience did indeed demand an encore, it was not for "Va, pensiero" but rather for the hymn "Immenso Jehova", sung by the Hebrew slaves in act 4 to thank God for saving his people. In light of these revelations, Verdi's position as the musical figurehead of the Risorgimento has been correspondingly revised. At Verdi's funeral however, the crowds in the streets spontaneously broke into "Va, pensiero". When his body was moved to the crypt of the Casa di Riposo, "Va, pensiero" was conducted by Arturo Toscanini with a chorus of 820 singers, with a crowd of estimated 300,000 in attendance.

== Music ==
The overture, often played outside the context of the complete work in orchestral concerts, mostly consists of themes from the opera, including the Chorus of Hebrew Slaves and the warlike music when the Israelites curse Ismaele for his betrayal. A stage band is used extensively in the opera, both for the march accompanying Nabucco on his arrival and for Fenena's funeral march. Propulsive energetic rhythms are a notable feature of much of the music, contrasted with more lyrical moments, providing dramatic pace. Both the bass Zaccaria in his prayer "Vieni o Levita", a quiet piece with the unusual accompaniment of six cellos, and the baritone Nabucco in his mad scene and other passages, are given music of great expressiveness, providing outstanding opportunities for the singers, but the tenor role of Ismaele is comparatively minor, unusual for a Verdi opera. The music for Abigaille is extremely demanding, requiring a soprano who can sing both very low and very high with dramatic force and is also capable of virtuoso vocal decoration. More than any of the soloists, however, the chorus, used in a new and dramatic fashion, is at the centre of the opera.

== Recordings ==
Year	Cast (Nabucco, Abigaille, Zaccaria, Ismaele, Fenena)	Conductor, Opera house and orchestra	Label
1949	Gino Bechi, Maria Callas, Luciano Neroni, Gino Sinimberghi, Amalia Pini	Vittorio Gui, Teatro di San Carlo Orchestra and Chorus (live recording)	CD: Melodram; MEL 26029-2
1951	Paolo Silveri, Caterina Mancini, Antonio Cassinelli, Mario Binci, Gabriella Gatti	Fernando Previtali, Orchestra Sinfonica e Coro di Roma della RAI	CD: Warner Fonit; 8573 82646-2
1965	Tito Gobbi, Elena Souliotis, Carlo Cava, Bruno Prevedi, Dora Caral	Lamberto Gardelli, Vienna State Opera Orchestra and Chorus	CD: Decca; Cat: 417 407-2
1977–78	Matteo Manuguerra, Renata Scotto, Nicolai Ghiaurov, Veriano Luchetti, Elena Obraztsova	Riccardo Muti, Philharmonia Orchestra and the Ambrosian Opera Chorus	CD: EMI Records; Cat: 747 488-2
1982	Piero Cappuccilli, Ghena Dimitrova, Yevgeny Nesterenko, Plácido Domingo, Lucia Valentini Terrani	Giuseppe Sinopoli, Deutsche Oper Berlin	CD: DG; Cat: DG 410 512-2
1987	Renato Bruson, Ghena Dimitrova, Paata Burchuladze, Bruno Beccaria, Raquel Pierotti	Riccardo Muti, La Scala Orchestra and Chorus	DVD: Warner; Cat: 5050467-0944-2-0
1999	Renato Bruson, Maria Guleghina, Ferruccio Furlanetto, Fabio Armiliato, Elena Zaremba	Daniel Oren, Tokyo Symphony Orchestra, Tokyo Opera Chorus	CD: Valois Auvidis; Cat: V4852
2002	Juan Pons, Maria Guleghina, Samuel Ramey, Gwyn Hughes Jones, Wendy White	James Levine, Metropolitan Opera	DVD: DG, live recording Cat: B0006O9M6S
2004	Alberto Gazzale, Susan Neves, Orlin Anastassov, Yasuharu Nakajiima, Annamaria Popescu	Riccardo Frizza, Teatro Carlo Felice Orchestra and Chorus	DVD: Dynamic, live recording Cat: 33465
2004	Renato Bruson, Maurizio Frusoni, Lauren Flanigan, Carlo Colombara, Monica Bacelli	Paolo Carignani, Teatro San Carlo Naples Orchestra and Chorus	DVD: Brilliant Classics, live recording Cat: 92270
2007	Leo Nucci, Maria Guleghina, Carlo Colombara, Fabio Sartori, Nino Surguladze,	Daniel Oren, Arena di Verona Orchestra and Chorus	DVD: Decca, live recording Cat: DDD 0440 074 3245 7 DH
2009	Leo Nucci, Dimitra Theodossiou, Riccardo Zanellato, Bruno Ribeiro, Annamaria Chiuri,	Michele Mariotti, Teatro Regio di Parma	DVD:C Major, live recording Cat:720408
