= Merville =

Merville may refer to:

== Communes in France ==
- Merville, Haute-Garonne, in the Haute-Garonne département
- Merville, Nord, in the Nord département
- Merville-Franceville-Plage, in the Calvados département

== Other places ==
- Merville Garden Village, Newtownabbey, County Antrim, Northern Ireland
- Merville, British Columbia
- Merville Dairy, a former Irish milk distribution company based in Finglas, Dublin that merged with other companies to form Premier Dairies
- Merville, Parañaque, a barangay in Parañaque, Metro Manila

== People ==
- Merville (playwright), French 19th-century playwright
