= Gustave Albitte =

French playwright

- Born: Louis Gustave Salve; 30 April 1812; Reims
- Died: 17 November 1898 (aged 86); Neuilly-sur-Seine
- Occupation: Playwright

Gustave Albitte (30 April 1812 – 17 November 1898) was a 19th-century French playwright. He was the son of the conventional Jean-Louis Albitte le Jeune and a nephew of Antoine Louis Albitte l'Aîné.

Besides the plays he wrote in collaboration for the Parisian scenes, he also authored two novels in the style of the 1830s, where elegant young leading a "fashionable" life are experiencing a "Wertherian fever". In addition, Albitte, who also was a lawyer, published a Cours de législation gouvernementale.

== Works ==
- Le Musicien de Valence, comédie-vaudeville in 1 act, with Antoine Simonnin, Paris, Théâtre de la Gaîté, 13 July 1834
- Le Septuagénaire, ou les Deux naissances, four-act drama, with Merville, Paris, Théâtre de la Gaîté, 12 August 1834
- Les Misères d'un timbalier, vaudeville in 1 act, with Lubize, Paris, Théâtre du Palais-Royal, July 1836
- Spectacle à la cour, comédie-vaudeville in 2 acts, with Emmanuel Théaulon and Lubize, Paris, Théâtre du Gymnase-Dramatique, 25 November 1837
- L'Ouverture de la chasse, tableau-vaudeville in 1 act, with Desvergers, Paris, Théâtre des Variétés, 9 September 1838
- Deux Femmes légères, folie-vaudeville in 2 acts, with Desvergers and Maurice Alhoy, Paris, Théâtre des Folies-Dramatiques, 14 August 1839
- Mon voisin d'omnibus, vaudeville in 1 act, with Louis Dugard, Paris, Théâtre du Palais-Royal, 18 July 1846
- L'Avocat pédicure, comédie-vaudeville in 1 act, with Eugène Labiche and Auguste Lefranc, Paris, Théâtre du Palais-Royal, 24 April 1847

Novels

- Une Vie d'homme, croquis, 1832
- Un Clair de lune, rêverie, 1833

Law

- Cours de législation gouvernementale, et études scientifiques sur les gouvernements de la France, depuis 1789 jusqu'à nos jours, 1835
