= Dieppe =

- Subprefecture and commune
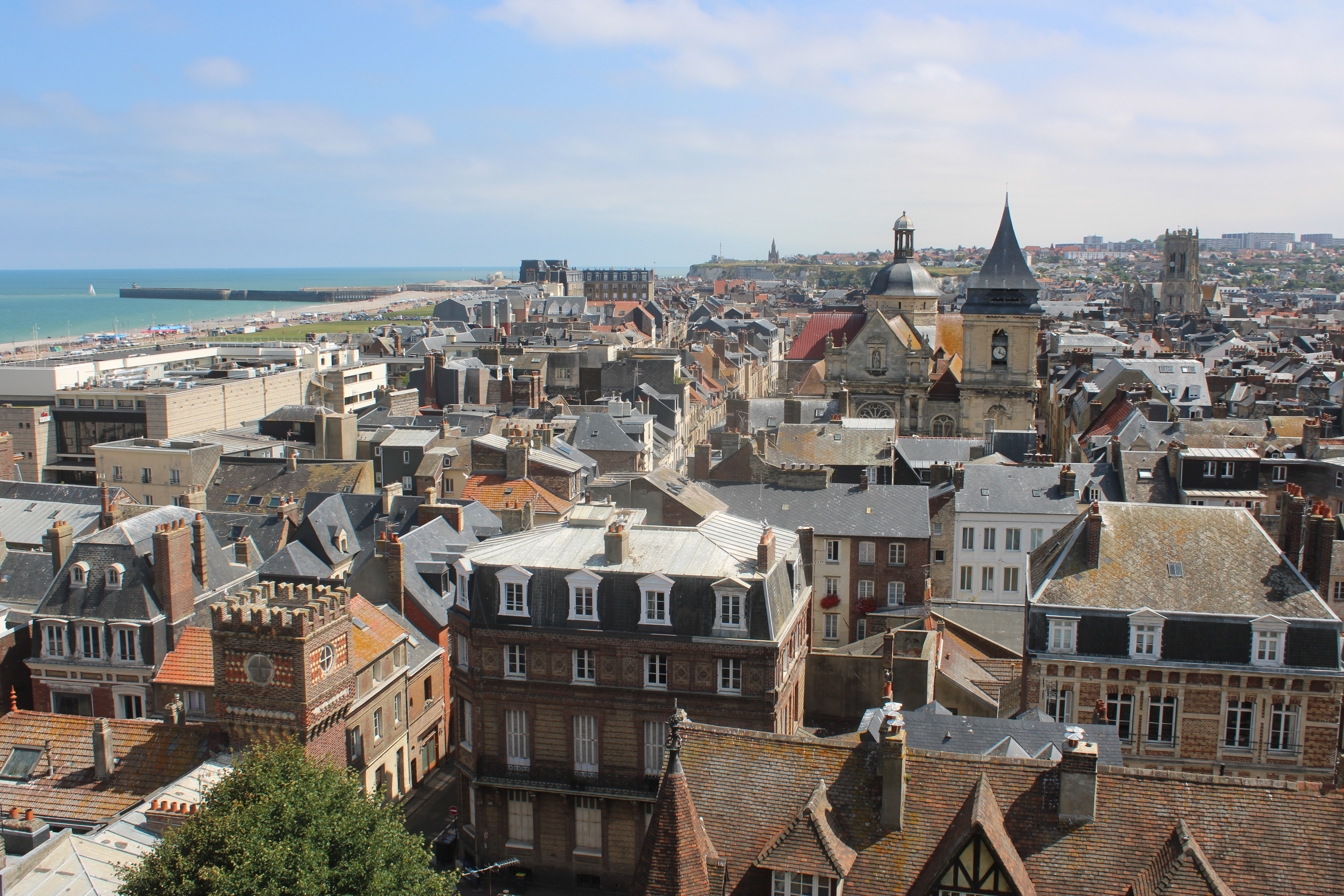
- A view of the centre of Dieppe in July 2022

- Coat of arms
- Location of Dieppe
- Location within France Location within Normandy
- Coordinates: 49°55′30″N 1°04′30″E
- Country: France
- Region: Normandy
- Department: Seine-Maritime
- Arrondissement: Dieppe
- Canton: Dieppe-1 and 2
- Intercommunality: CA Région Dieppoise

Government
  - Mayor (2026–32): Nicolas Langlois (PCF)
- Area^{1}: 11.67 km^{2} (4.51 sq mi)
- Highest elevation: 70 m (230 ft)
- Lowest elevation: 5 m (16 ft)
- Population (2023): 28,496
  - Density: 2,442/km^{2} (6,324/sq mi)
- Demonym(s): Dieppois (male); Dieppoise (female)
- Time zone: UTC+01:00 (CET)
  - Summer (DST): UTC+02:00 (CEST)
- INSEE/Postal code: 76217 /76200
- ^{1} French Land Register data, which excludes lakes, ponds, glaciers > 1 km^{2} (0.386 sq mi or 247 acres) and river estuaries.

Dieppe (French pronunciation: [djɛp]; Norman: Dgieppe) is a coastal commune in the Seine-Maritime department, Normandy, northern France.

Dieppe is a seaport on the English Channel at the mouth of the river Arques. A regular ferry service runs to Newhaven in England.

Famous for its scallops, Dieppe also has a popular pebbled beach, a 15th-century castle and the churches of Saint-Jacques and Saint-Remi. The mouth of the river Scie lies at Hautot-sur-Mer, directly to the west of Dieppe.

== History ==
The name "Dieppe" comes from Old English dēōp or Old Norse djúpr 'deep', in reference to the depth of the natural estuary.

The first human activity in Dieppe were the Gauls, who used the area as a fishing and maritime trade hub, which continued as Romans settled there. Following the fall of the Roman Empire, the area was regularly visited and eventually occupied by Vikings. The first mention of a permanent fishing settlement was recorded in 1030. Dieppe was an important prize fought over during the Hundred Years' War.

By the Middle Ages, Dieppe had become a heavily frequented port. The town was intermittently under control of England until 1443. Under Louis XI, Dieppe was used to launch privateering and maritime expedition operations.

=== Colonial activity ===
It housed the most advanced French school of cartography in the 16th century. Two of France's best navigators, Michel le Vasseur and his brother Thomas le Vasseur, lived in Dieppe when they were recruited to join the expedition of René Goulaine de Laudonnière which departed Le Havre for Florida on April 20, 1564. The expedition resulted in the construction of Fort Caroline, the first French colony in the New World. At the same time, merchants of Dieppe were beginning to frequent the ports of Senegambia.

Another expedition two years before, in which Goulaine de Laudonnière was under the command of Jean Ribault, a local Huguenot captain, had resulted in the foundation of Charlesfort, now in South Carolina. Dieppe was the premier port of the kingdom in the 17th century. On 23 July 1632, 300 colonists heading to New France departed from Dieppe. At the Revocation of the Edict of Nantes in 1685, Dieppe lost 3,000 of its Huguenot citizens, who fled abroad.

In 1633 the merchants of Dieppe and Rouen were granted a monopoly on trade between the Senegal River and Gambia River by Cardinal Richelieu. Norman French was spoken as a trade language in ports of modern-day Senegal such as Rufisque in the late 17th century. In 1637 Captain Thomas Lambert sailed from Dieppe for the Compagnie du Cap-Vert et du Sénégal, and established a trading post at the mouth of the Senegal that would eventually become Saint-Louis.

=== Port and resort ===
John Knox briefly stayed in Dieppe after Mary I outlawed Protestantism in England, on his way to Geneva to meet John Calvin.

Dieppe was an important target in wartime; the town was largely destroyed by an Anglo-Dutch naval bombardment in 1694. It was rebuilt after 1696 in a typical French classical style by Ventabren, an architect, who gave it its unique feature for a sea port. It was popularised as a seaside resort following the 1824 visit of the widowed Duchess of Berry, daughter-in-law of Charles X. She encouraged the building of the recently renovated municipal theatre, the Petit-Théâtre (1825), associated particularly with Camille Saint-Saëns. The city enjoyed Mayoral status at this point and in 1787, the "Maire de Dieppe" was N. Nile.

During the later 19th century, Dieppe became popular with English artists as a beach resort. Prominent literary figures such as Arthur Symons loved to keep up with the latest fads of avant-garde France here, and during "the season" sometimes stayed for weeks on end.

=== Second World War ===
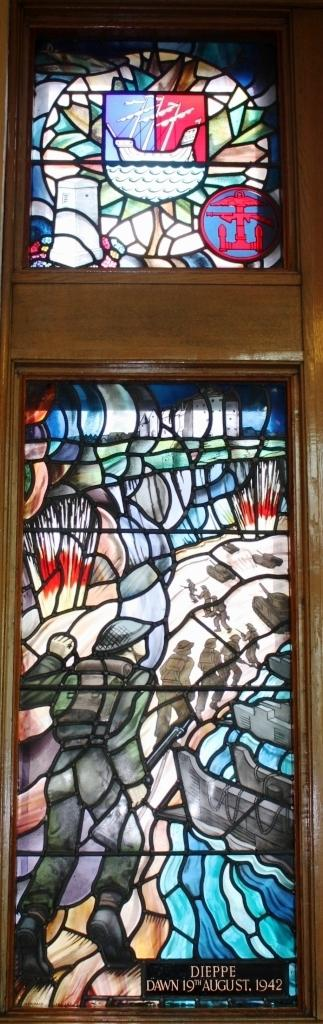
Dieppe Dawn, 19 August 1942, memorial stained glass, Royal Military College of Canada

During the Second World War Dieppe was occupied by German naval and army forces after the fall of France in 1940. In order to allow a better defence of the coast against a possible Allied landing, the Germans destroyed the mauresque casino that was located near the beach area. The destruction of the casino had only begun at the time of the Dieppe Raid.

The raid proved a costly lesson for the Allies. On 19 August 1942, Allied soldiers, mainly drawn from the 2nd Canadian Infantry Division, landed at Dieppe in the hope of occupying the town for a short time, gaining intelligence and drawing the Luftwaffe into open battle. The Allies suffered more than 1,400 deaths, 907 Canadian, and 1,946 Canadian soldiers were captured – more prisoners than the army lost in the 11 months of the 1944–45 NW Europe campaign. However, no major objectives were achieved. More recent research suggests the raid was a massive cover for an intelligence operation to capture German code machine components.

French soldiers from the region, captured in the fighting of 1940, were returned to the area after the Dieppe Raid as a reward by the German occupation authorities, who felt that the conduct of the French civilians in Dieppe had been correct and had not hindered the defence of the port during the battle.

The port remained garrisoned by German forces until the conclusion of the Battle of Normandy. When the First Canadian Army approached at the end of August, the garrison withdrew, not desiring to enter into battle for the port.

Dieppe was liberated on 1 September 1944, by soldiers from the 2nd Canadian Infantry Division. On 3 September, the entire division paused for reorganization, and a victory parade was held; contingents representing all major units of the 2nd Division marched 10 abreast behind the massed pipes and drums of the division's highland regiments. A memorial service was held in the nearby Canadian military cemetery to honour those killed in the Dieppe Raid.

=== Post-war ===
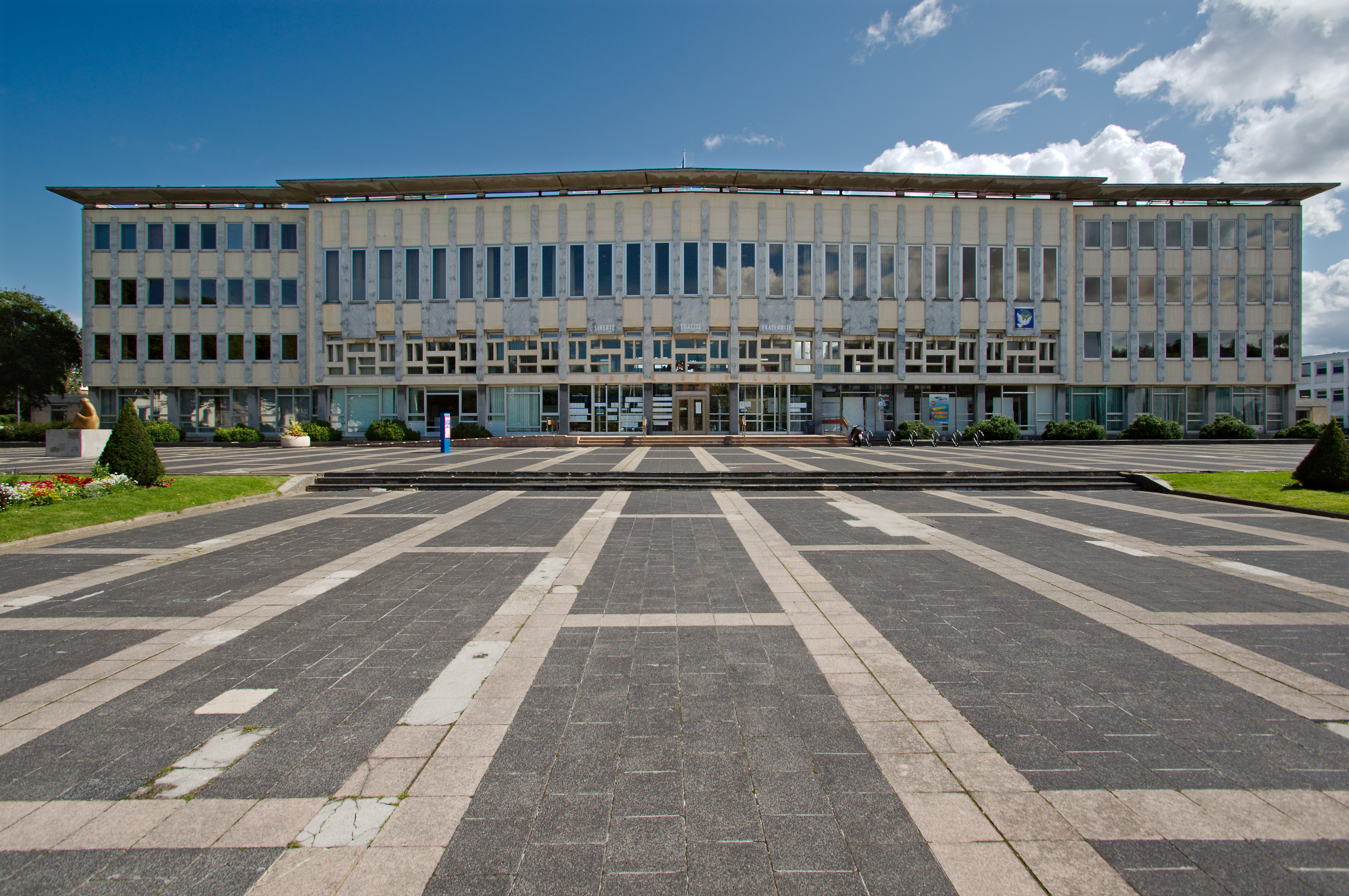
The Hôtel de Ville

Between 10 and 11 June 1945, fifteen people, including two police officers, were killed and nine were wounded in a series of shootings perpetrated by a drunk soldier, Abd el Maleck, who was on the run for an attempted murder on Rue Gambetta. He was captured on 11 June after being wounded. Maleck was court-martialed for murder and sentenced to death on 22 September 1945. He was executed by firing squad on 14 February 1946.

Dieppe, a city in New Brunswick, Canada, received its present name in 1946, in honour of the commemoration of the 913 Canadian soldiers killed in the Dieppe Raid. The majority of its inhabitants are of Acadian descent.

The Hôtel de Ville was completed in 1966.

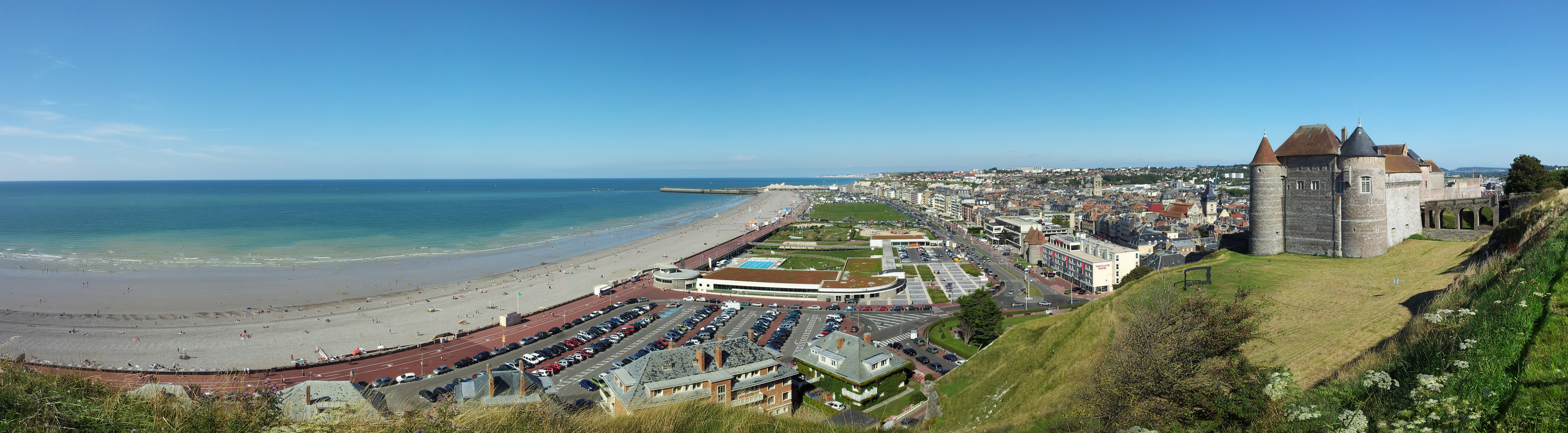
Panoramic view of Dieppe (taken from a hill close to the castle Château de Dieppe)

== Geography ==
Dieppe belongs to the Pays de Caux, lying along the Alabaster Coast in the region of Normandy. It is located on the Channel coast, north of Rouen at the mouth of the river Arques and lies east of the mouth of the river Scie.

== Climate ==
Climate data for Dieppe, elevation: 40 m (130 ft) (1991-2020 normals, extremes 1949-present)
Month	Jan	Feb	Mar	Apr	May	Jun	Jul	Aug	Sep	Oct	Nov	Dec	Year
Record high °C (°F)	16.4 (61.5)	20.0 (68.0)	23.8 (74.8)	27.6 (81.7)	32.8 (91.0)	36.1 (97.0)	40.4 (104.7)	36.1 (97.0)	32.7 (90.9)	27.5 (81.5)	21.0 (69.8)	16.9 (62.4)	40.4 (104.7)
Mean daily maximum °C (°F)	7.9 (46.2)	8.4 (47.1)	10.6 (51.1)	13.1 (55.6)	15.8 (60.4)	18.6 (65.5)	20.5 (68.9)	21.2 (70.2)	19.3 (66.7)	15.8 (60.4)	11.5 (52.7)	8.5 (47.3)	14.3 (57.7)
Daily mean °C (°F)	5.6 (42.1)	5.8 (42.4)	7.7 (45.9)	9.7 (49.5)	12.6 (54.7)	15.4 (59.7)	17.4 (63.3)	17.8 (64.0)	15.8 (60.4)	12.8 (55.0)	9.0 (48.2)	6.2 (43.2)	11.3 (52.3)
Mean daily minimum °C (°F)	3.4 (38.1)	3.2 (37.8)	4.8 (40.6)	6.3 (43.3)	9.4 (48.9)	12.3 (54.1)	14.3 (57.7)	14.5 (58.1)	12.2 (54.0)	9.8 (49.6)	6.5 (43.7)	4.0 (39.2)	8.4 (47.1)
Record low °C (°F)	−16.4 (2.5)	−16.6 (2.1)	−9.4 (15.1)	−3.0 (26.6)	0.0 (32.0)	1.8 (35.2)	5.8 (42.4)	4.6 (40.3)	1.2 (34.2)	−3.3 (26.1)	−8.0 (17.6)	−11.0 (12.2)	−16.6 (2.1)
Average precipitation mm (inches)	63.7 (2.51)	56.1 (2.21)	49.4 (1.94)	52.3 (2.06)	60.7 (2.39)	54.8 (2.16)	58.2 (2.29)	70.0 (2.76)	66.9 (2.63)	89.9 (3.54)	88.9 (3.50)	94.3 (3.71)	805.2 (31.70)
Average precipitation days (≥ 1.0 mm)	12.7	10.8	10.1	9.4	9.1	8.7	8.7	9.4	10.1	12.6	13.8	14.4	129.8
Mean monthly sunshine hours	68.2	84.3	120.4	166.4	213.1	215.7	224.8	233.3	159.7	125.2	75.1	46.7	1,732.9
Source 1: Meteociel
Source 2: Infoclimat (sunshine hours)

== Toponymy ==
Mentioned as Deppae in 1015–1029, Dieppa in 1030, then in the 12th century: Deppa, Deupa and Diopa.

From Old English dēop or Old Norse djúpr (both "deep"). The nominalization from an Old English or Norse adjective, being unusual, dēop / djúpr could be followed by the Old English word ǣ / ea or Old Norse á "stream, river" (cf. Djúpá, river in Iceland).

The same adjective can be recognized in other place-names like Dieppedalle (f. e. Saint-Vaast-Dieppedalle) and Dipdal in Normandy, which is the same as Deepdale in Great Britain.

The stream running through Dieppe was called Tella in Merovingian and Carolingian documents, before being called Dieppe in the 10th century. The name has stuck to the town, although the name of the stream changed again, to Béthune.

== Heraldry ==
Arms of Dieppe	The arms of Dieppe are blazoned: Per pale azure and gules, a 3-masted ship sails furled argent.

== Historical images of Dieppe ==
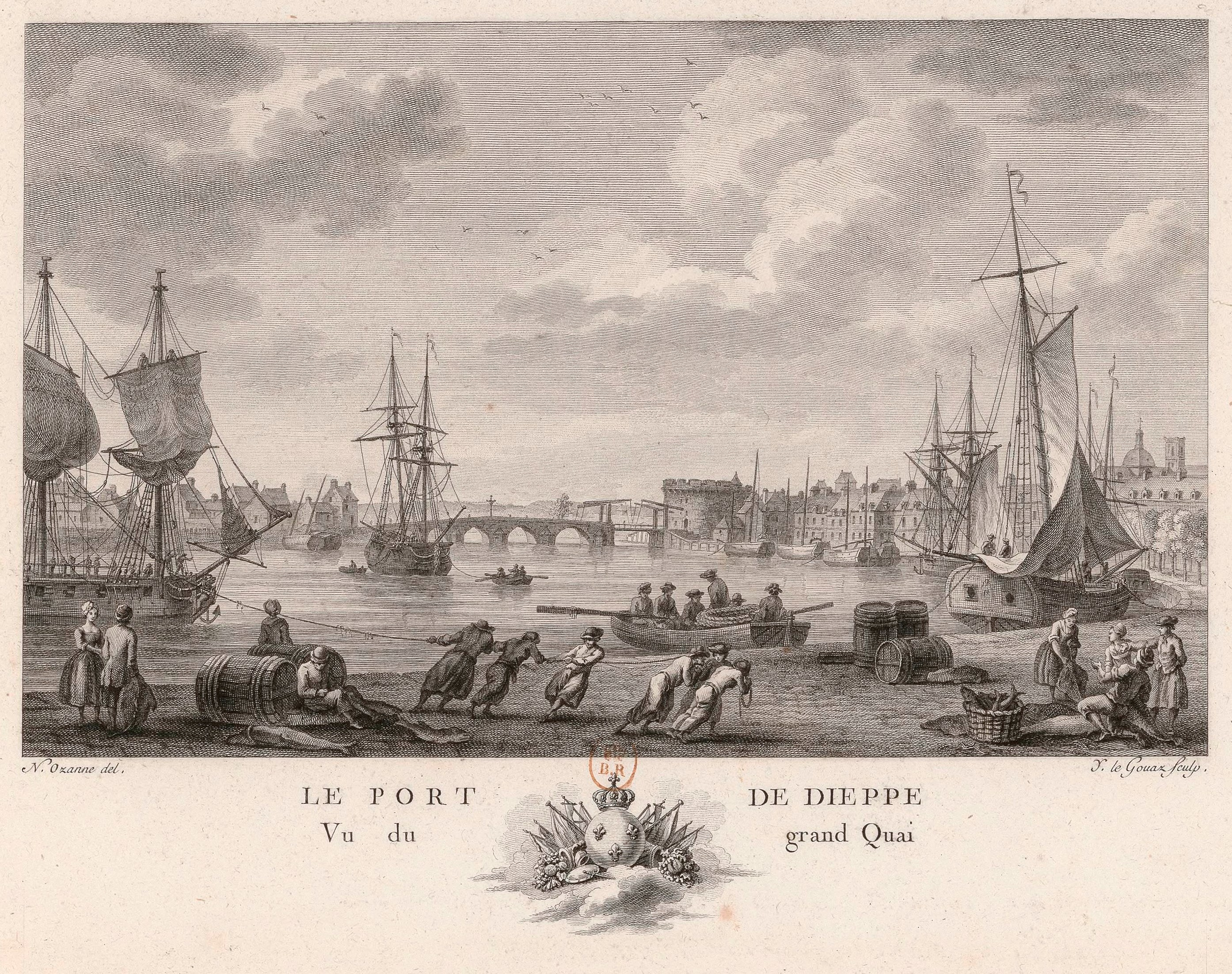
View of Dieppe's Grand quai

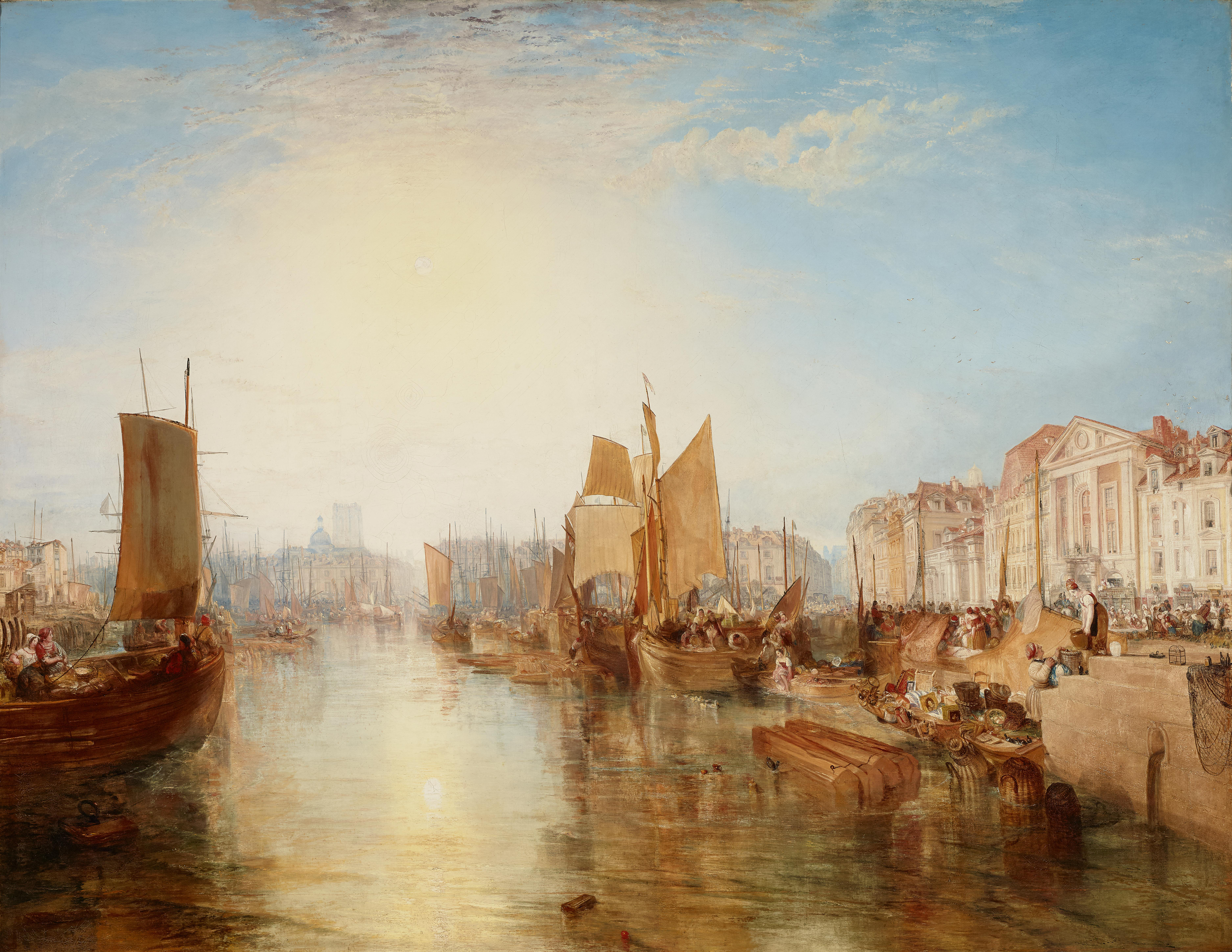
J. M. W. Turner, The Harbour of Dieppe, 1826

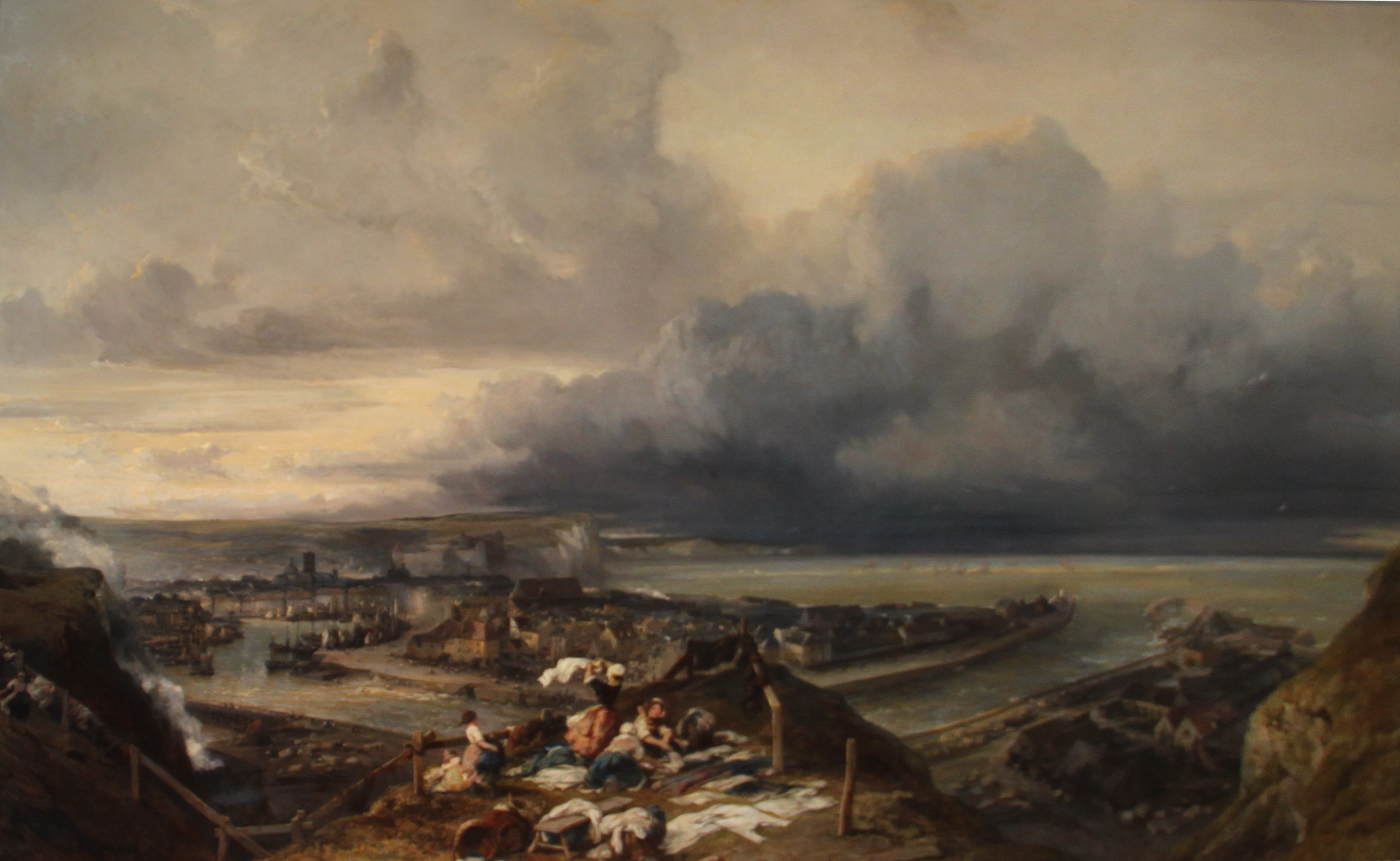
The Town and Port of Dieppe by Eugène Isabey, 1842

Café des Tribunaux, Dieppe by Walter Sickert, 1890

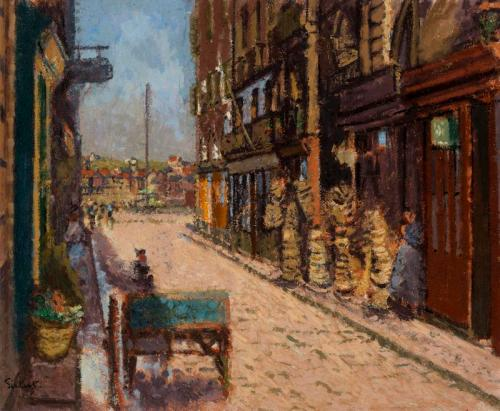
Walter Sickert, The Basket Shop, Rue St Jean, Dieppe, c. 1911 – 1912, Aberdeen Art Gallery

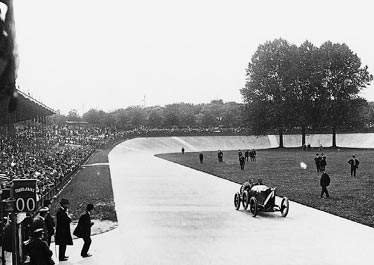
Georges Boillot winning the 1912 French Grand Prix in Dieppe

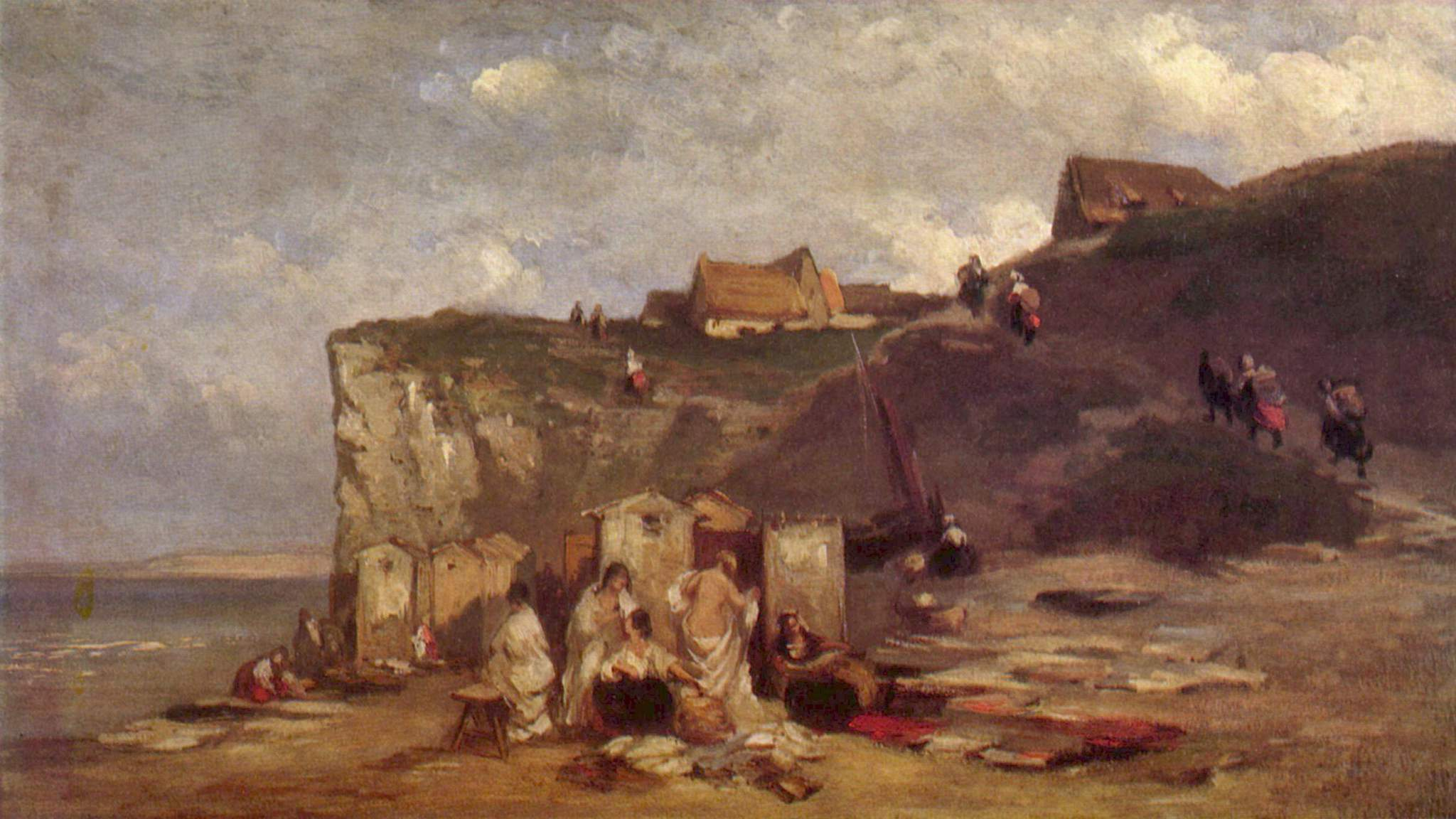
Carl Spitzweg's painting Frauenbad in Dieppe III

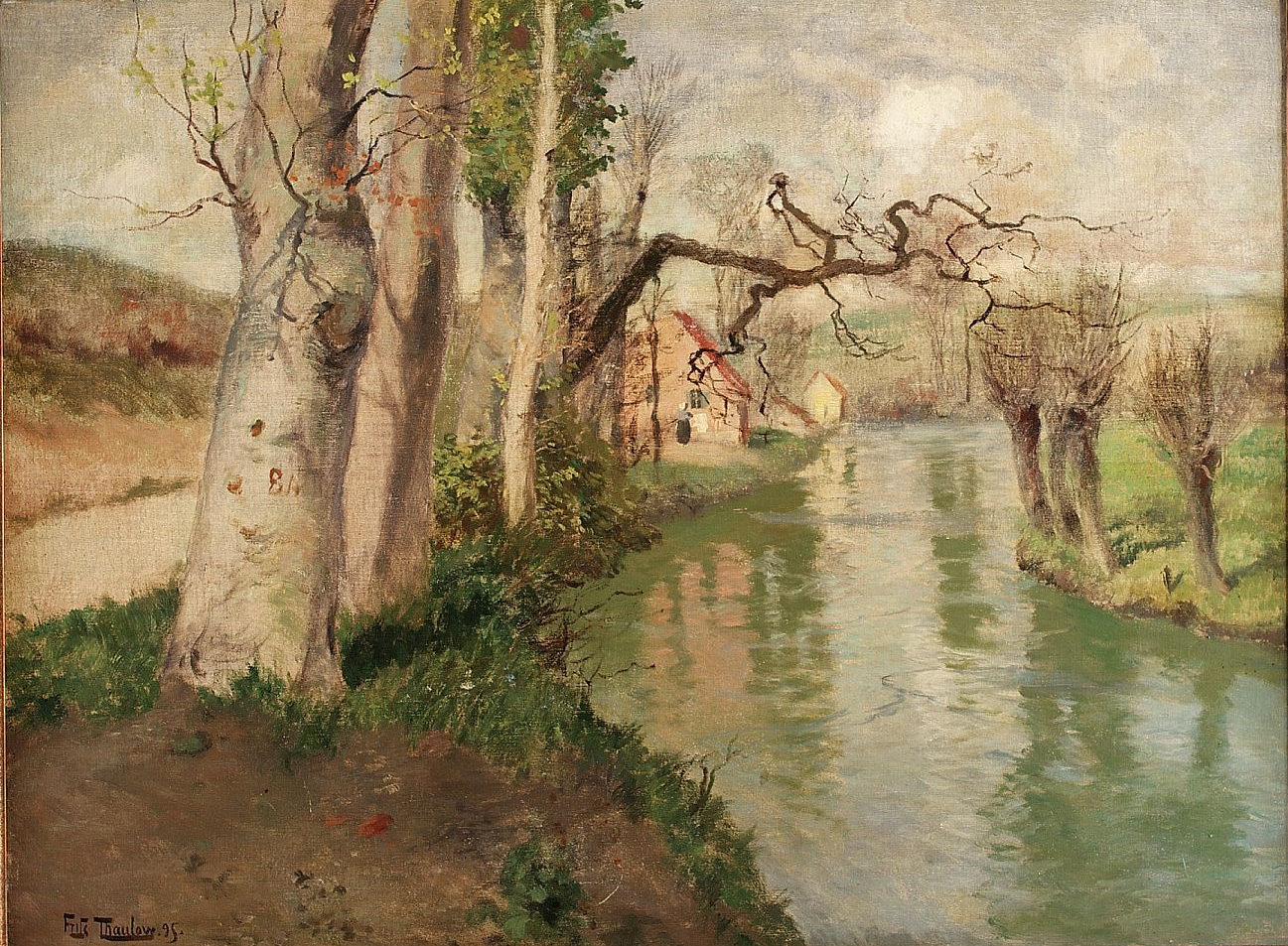
Frits Thaulow's Fra Dieppe med elven Arques (From Dieppe with the river Arques)

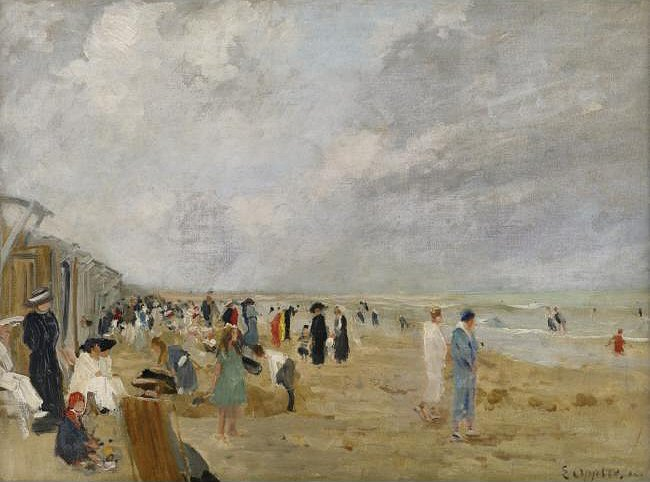
Ernst Oppler At the beach (c. 1912)

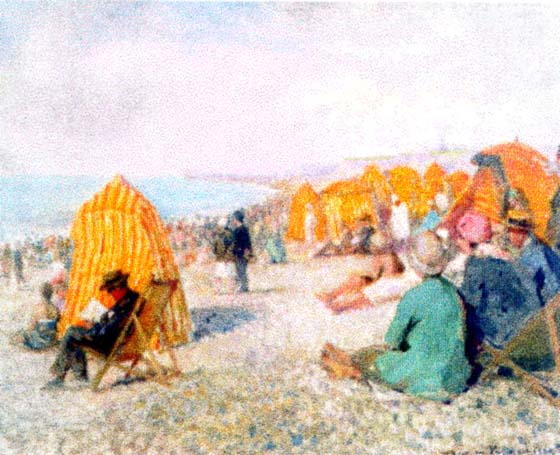
Nicolae Vermont's painting View of Dieppe's beach (1929)

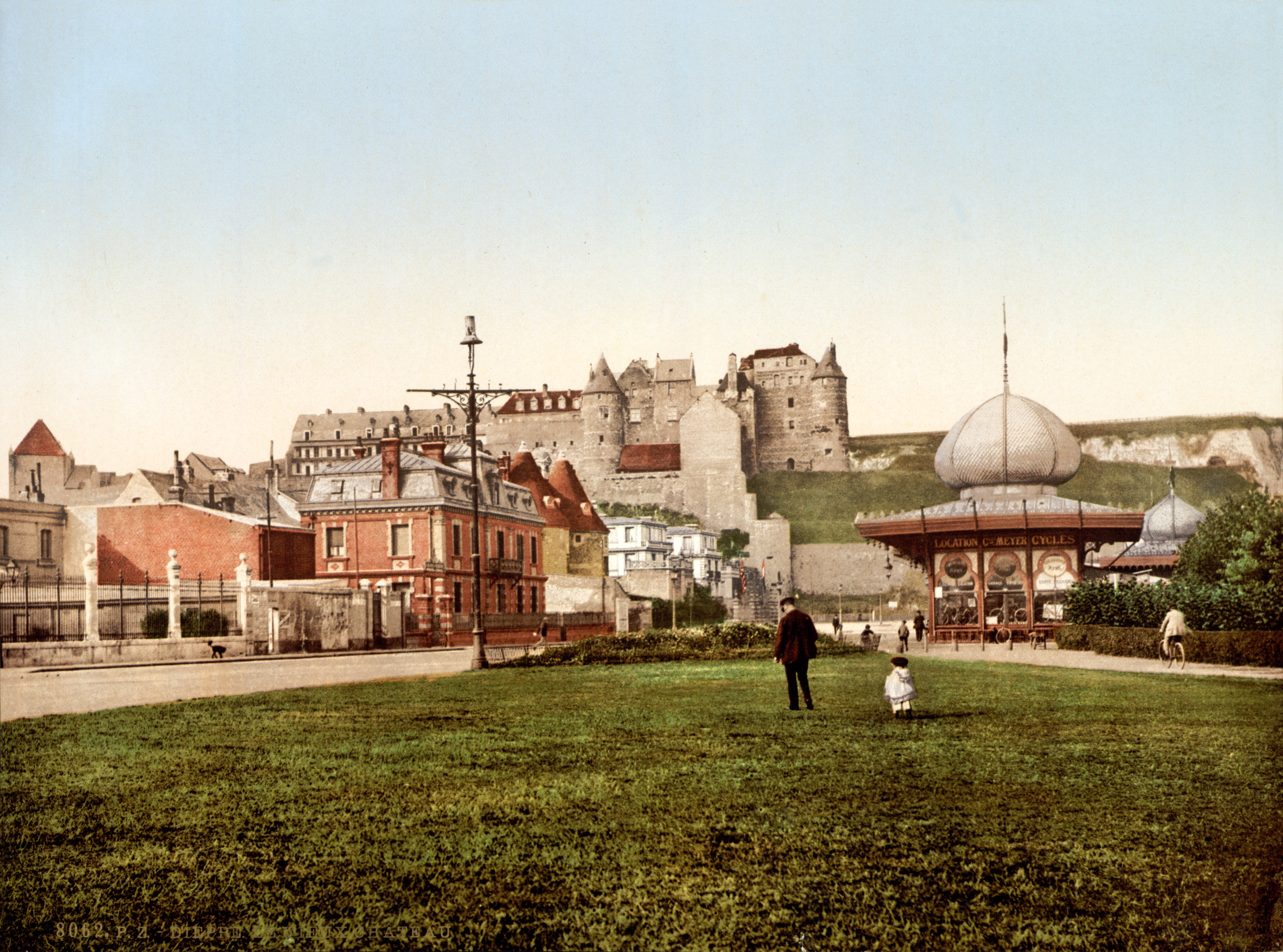
The castle in the 1890s

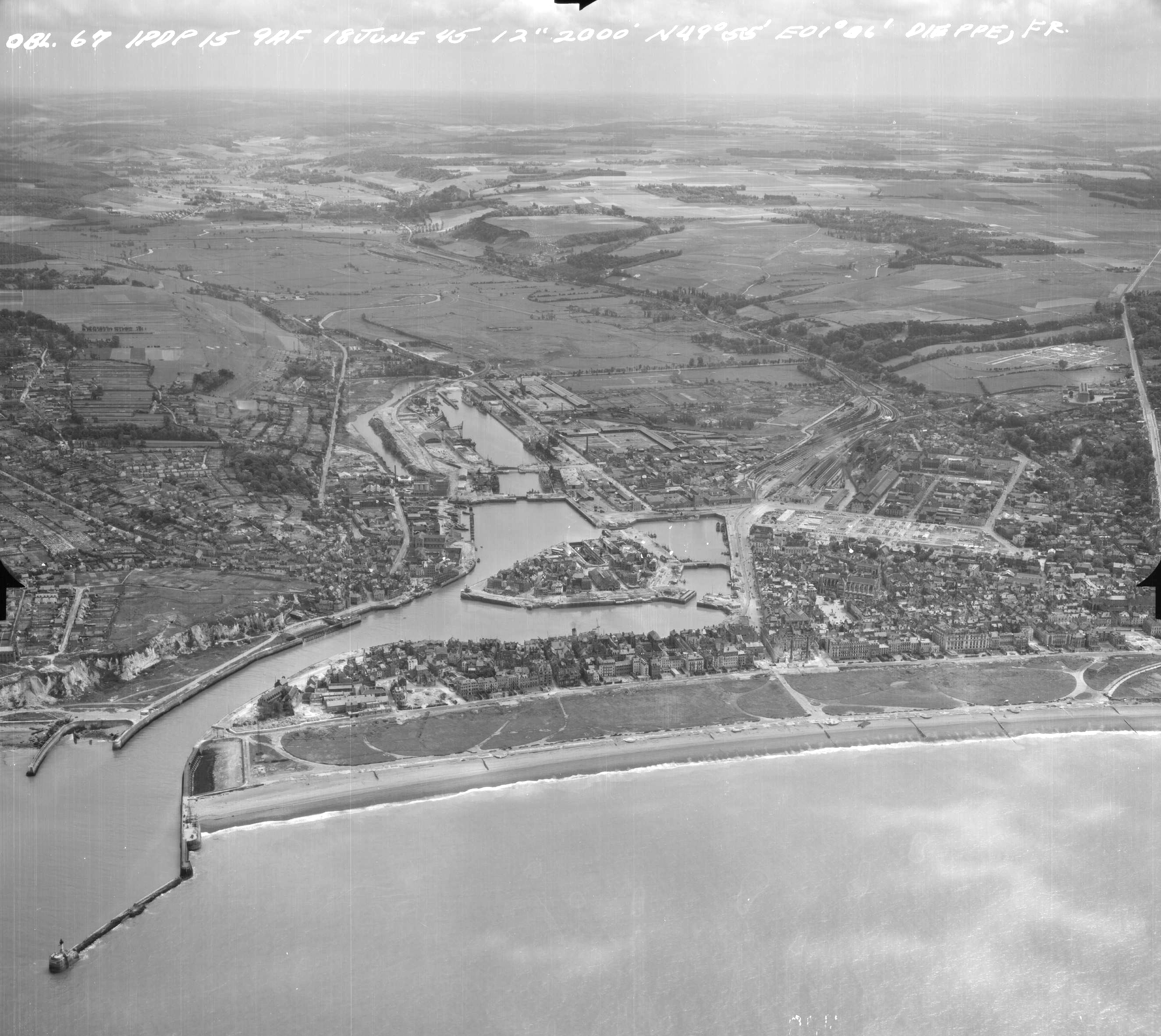
Aerial photograph taken in June, 1945

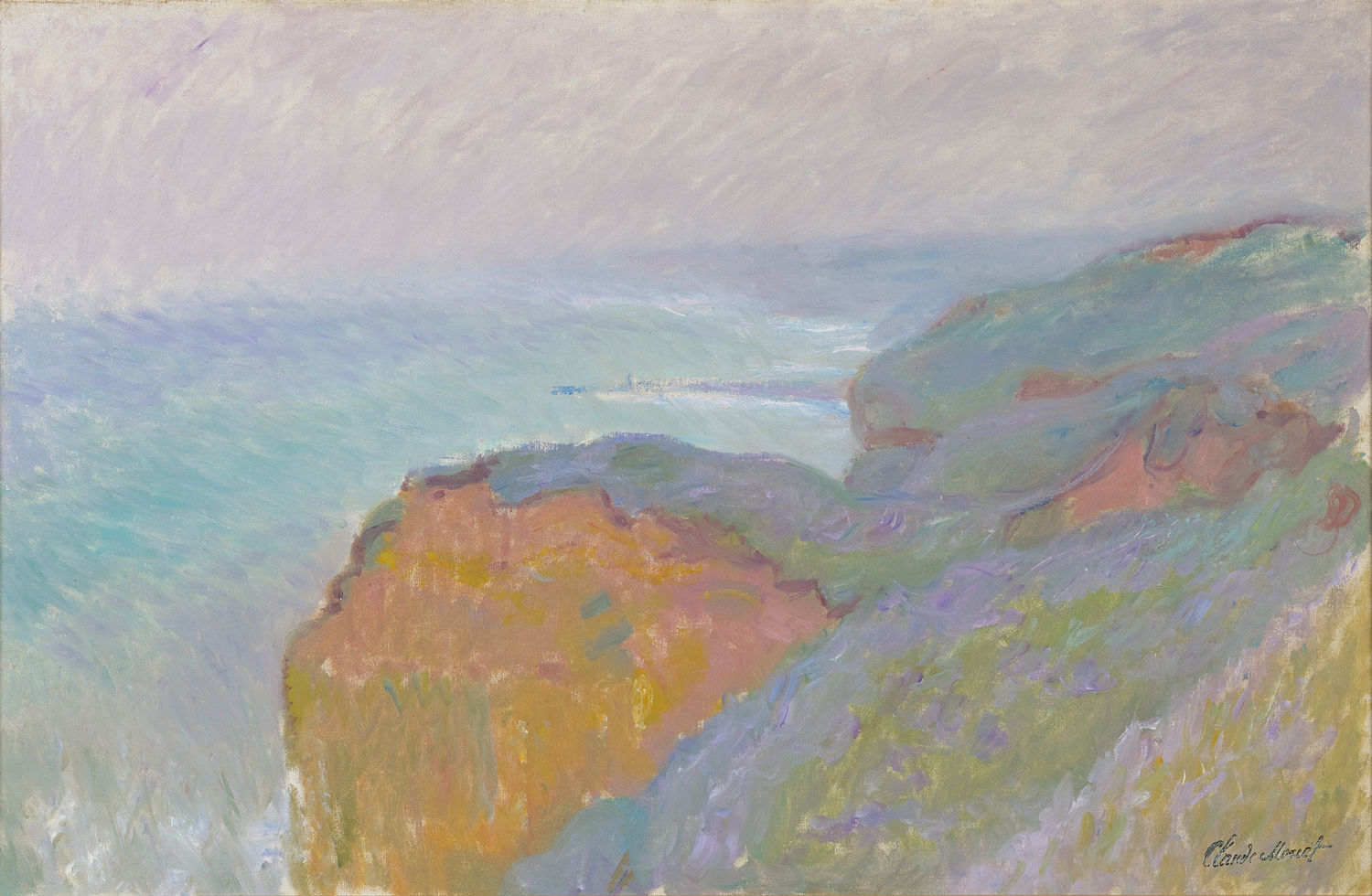
Au Val Saint-Nicolas près Dieppe by Claude Monet. Painted 1897. Private collection.

== Population ==
Historical population

Year	Pop.	±% p.a.
1793	25,000	—
1800	20,000	−3.14%
1806	18,248	−1.52%
1821	16,664	−0.60%
1831	16,016	−0.40%
1836	16,820	+0.98%
1841	16,443	−0.45%
1846	16,844	+0.48%
1851	17,669	+0.96%
1856	19,231	+1.71%
1861	20,187	+0.98%
1866	19,946	−0.24%
1872	19,002	−0.80%
1876	20,333	+1.71%
1881	22,003	+1.59%
1886	23,050	+0.93%
1891	22,771	−0.24%
1896	22,439	−0.29%
1901	22,839	+0.35%

Year	Pop.	±% p.a.
1906	23,629	+0.68%
1911	23,973	+0.29%
1921	24,402	+0.18%
1926	24,945	+0.44%
1931	25,117	+0.14%
1936	25,560	+0.35%
1946	21,770	−1.59%
1954	26,427	+2.45%
1962	30,013	+1.60%
1968	30,016	+0.00%
1975	39,466	+3.99%
1982	35,957	−1.32%
1990	35,894	−0.02%
1999	34,653	−0.39%
2007	33,375	−0.47%
2012	30,632	−1.70%
2017	29,080	−1.03%
2023	28,496	−0.34%

Source: EHESS and INSEE (1968–2023)

== Sights ==
The castle, Château de Dieppe, which survived the 1694 bombardment, is now a museum and exhibition space, with a strong maritime collection. A rich collection of 17th- and 18th-century ivory carvings, including lacy folding fans, for which Dieppe was known, and the furnishings and papers of Camille Saint-Saëns. The castle's interior courtyard is picturesque.

At the Square du Canada, near the castle in a park at the western end of the Esplanade, there is a monument erected by the town commemorating the long relationship between Dieppe and Canada. The events recorded begin with the early 16th century, and culminate with the Dieppe Raid and the liberation of Dieppe by Canadians on 1 September 1944. The base of the monument is inscribed with the words "nous nous souvenons" ("we remember"). Above the monument, the Flag of Canada is flown side by side with that of France.

The Notre-Dame-de-Bon-Secours Chapel of Dieppe stands on the coast.

Some of the Canadian soldiers who were killed are buried in the Dieppe Canadian War Cemetery, in the commune of Saint-Aubin-sur-Scie south-west of Dieppe.

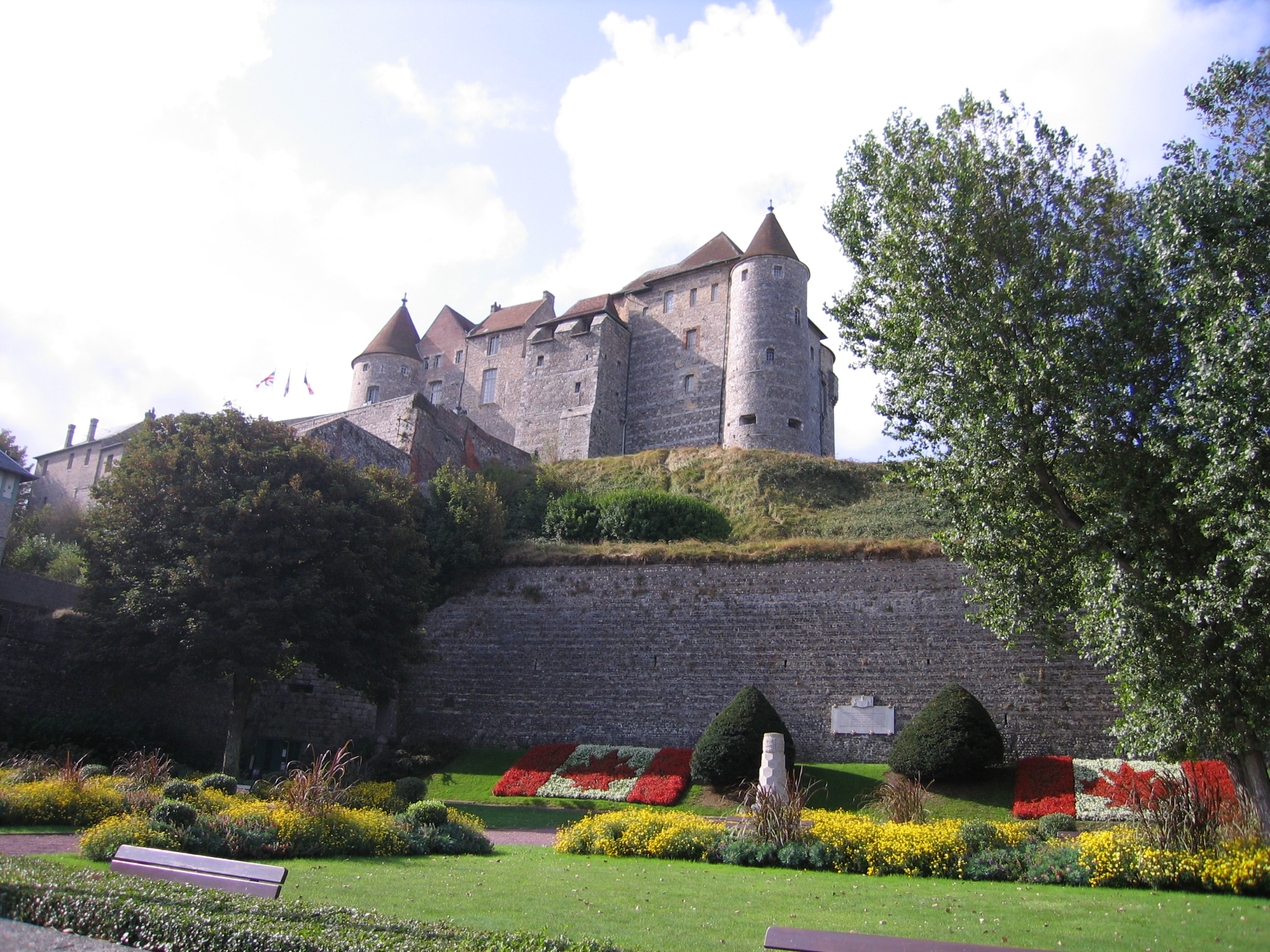
Château-musée de Dieppe

Château-musée

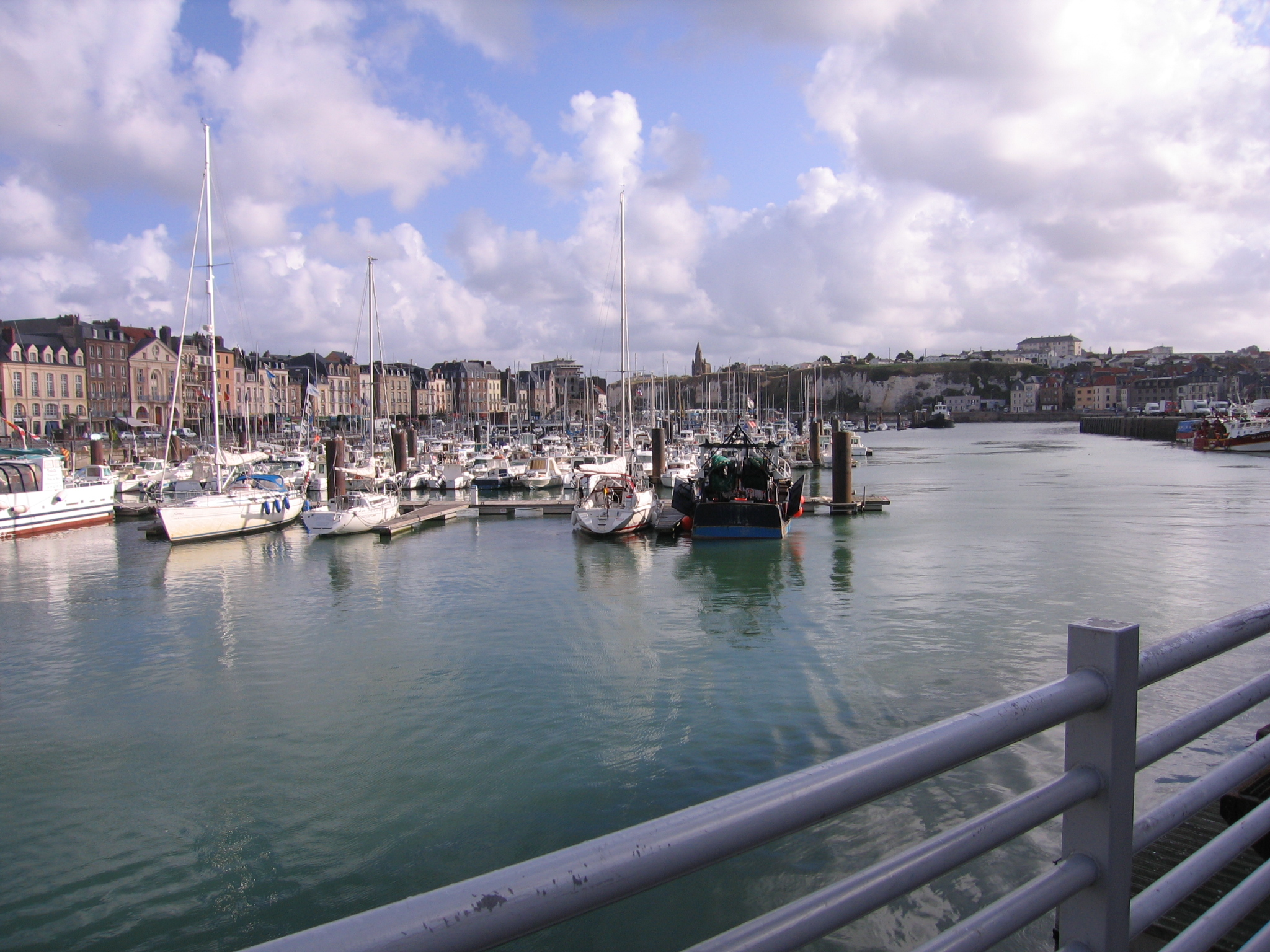
The harbour

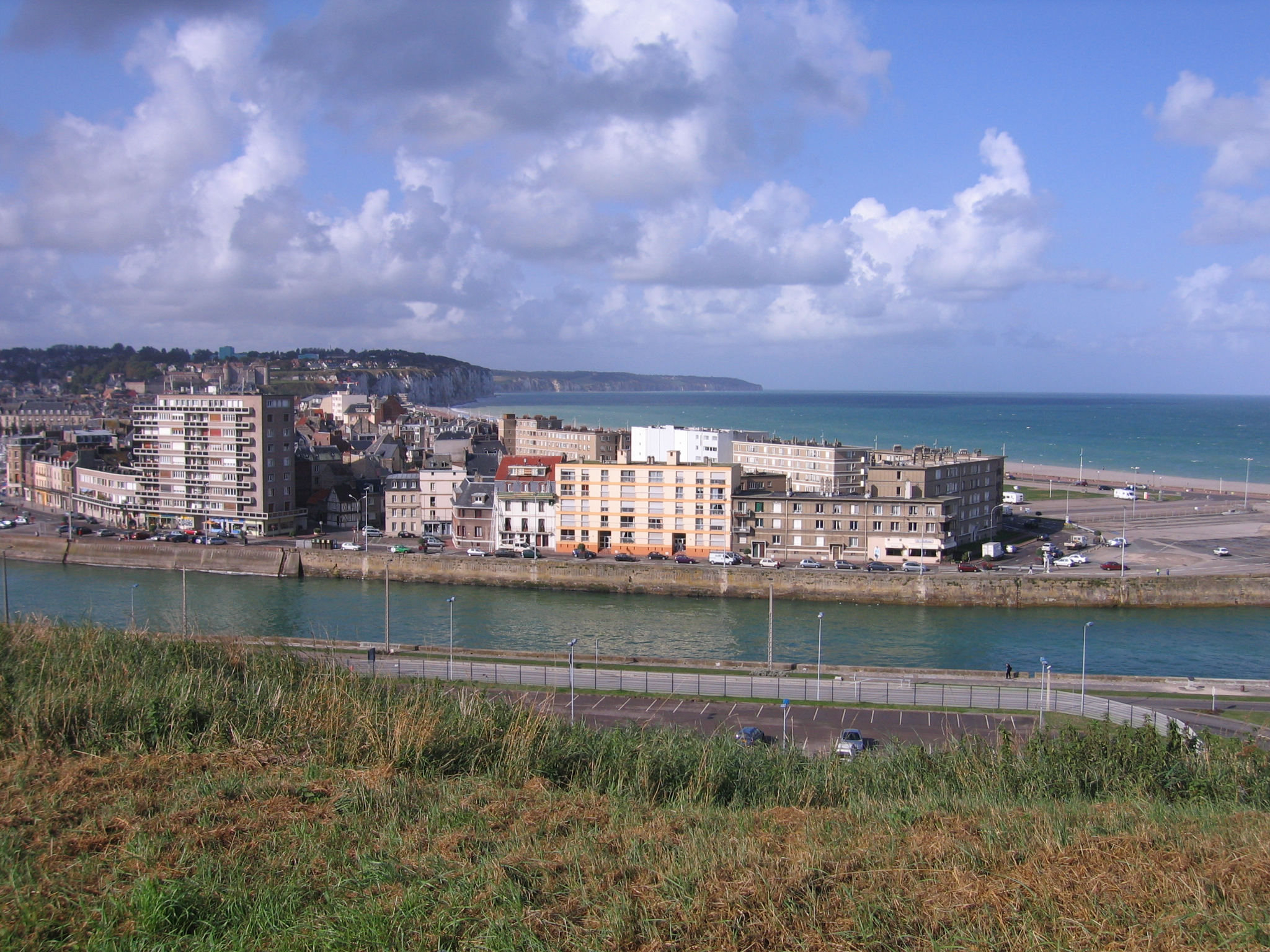
The waterfront

Various buildings and sights include:

- The small municipal theatre, reopened in 2002: the small municipal theater (1900) has been listed in the supplementary inventory of historic monuments since 1990. It has a Louis XV rockery with gilding style. Its Italian-style theatre, built by the engineer Frissard, was donated by the Duchess of Berry to the municipality in 1826. Rebuilt in 190 and enlarged with a foyer facing the sea, it is contemporary with the Moorish casino and is one of the last vestiges of the time when Dieppe attracted the European aristocracy and upper middle class. Damaged during the Second World War, its facades were covered in cement in the 1960s. The theater was closed in 1961. The theater has been a source of political controversy, especially in 2007 when a rehabilitation project was proposed by the municipal majority at the time but fought by the local opposition.
- The casino, inaugurated in 1961 in the presence of Robert Buron, Minister of Public Works, Transport and Tourism, succeeds the Moorish casino and the Art Deco casino of the 1930s. It is mainly located on the site of the former Villa Rachel which was demolished to allow its construction. It has a remarkable architecture.
- L'Estran Cité de la mer, an associative center for scientific and technical culture on the theme of the Upper Normandy coast, presents over 1,600 m2 of exhibition space, shipbuilding, fishing techniques, the coastal environment and fauna of the English Channel.
- The underground aqueduct, also called the aqueduct of the blue source, is a gravity aqueduct which was drilled in the 16th century by the engineer Toustain under the plateau of Janval. Over 6.7 km, it once brought water from an abundant source located in Petit-Appeville to the city, and is still used in 2022 for the electricity and telecommunications networks.
- The water tower, in the Vertus district at the entrance to the city of Dieppe, was built in 1971 by the architect Herbelin. It has been decorated since 1973 with a polychrome fresco by Victor Vasarely, made up of orange and black diamonds on a blue background.
- A new seaside resort inaugurated on May 15, 2007, contains an outdoor seawater swimming pool, several indoor leisure pools and a thalassotherapy center.
- A Canadian military cemetery is present in Dieppe.

== Transport ==
Dieppe railway station, operated by SNCF, has frequent departures for Rouen-Rive-Droite. SNCF operates also buses to Gisors-Embranchement through Serqueux.

Dieppe has a ferry port with direct services to the English town of Newhaven, situated at the mouth of the River Ouse in East Sussex. The twice-daily service to the Port of Newhaven is operated by DFDS Seaways, under a concession subsidised by the French government. Services are operated using the MS Côte D'Albâtre and MS Seven Sisters.

=== Current services ===
- DFDS Seaways (Newhaven: three sailings daily)

=== Former services ===
- Hoverspeed (Newhaven: three sailings daily). Withdrawn in 2004.
- P&O Stena Line (Newhaven: three sailings daily). Withdrawn in 1999.

== Administration ==
The current mayor of Dieppe is Nicolas Langlois. A member of the French Communist Party, he was elected in 2017, and re-elected in 2020.

== Economy ==
Historically a major fishing hub, it is still home to a large ferry port and one of the busiest ports in Europe; in the 17th century the first French East Indies Company operated from the port. Until the mid-19th century the Ave Maria lace, a hand-made lace manufacturer, was largely based in Dieppe. The town is now home to the Alpine Automobiles global headquarters.

== Sport ==
The town is home to FC Dieppe, one of the oldest football clubs in the country having been founded in 1896.

== International relations ==
Dieppe is twinned with

- Dieppe, New Brunswick, Canada

== Notable people ==
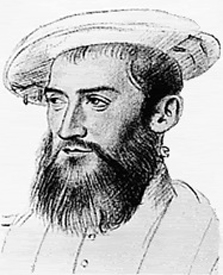
Jean Ribault

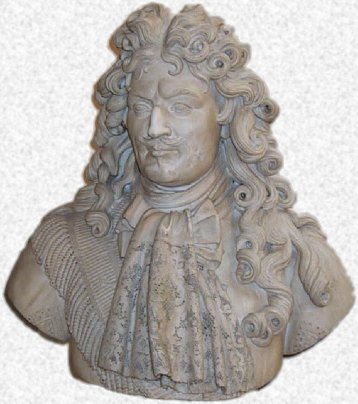
Abraham Duquesne

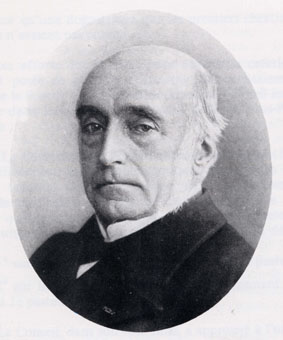
Albert Réville

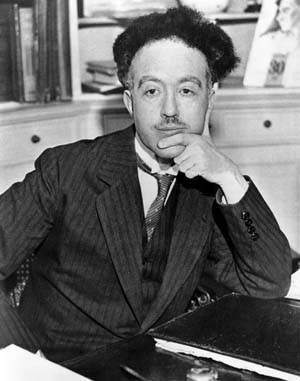
Louis de Broglie, 1929

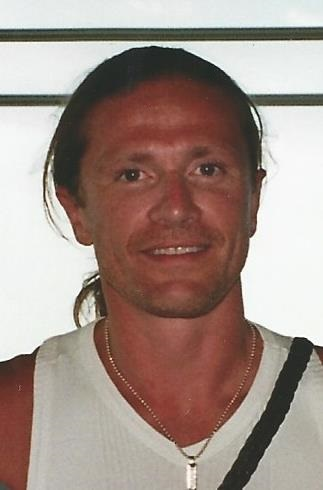
Emmanuel Petit, 2005

- Jean Ango (1480–1551), ship owner, provided ships to Francis I of France
- Jean Parmentier (1494–1529), navigator, cartographer and poet
- Jean Cousin (15th century), Normand navigator
- Jean Ribault (1520–1565), French navigator and corsaire Protestant
- Pierre de Chauvin de Tonnetuit, (ca.1550–1603), naval and military captain and Huguenot trader at Honfleur
- Salomon de Caus (1576–1626), Huguenot engineer
- Isaac de Caus (1590–1648), landscaper and architect, worked in London
- Guillaume Le Vasseur de Beauplan (ca.1600–1673), French-Polish cartographer, engineer and architect
- St. Antoine Daniel SJ, (1601–1648), Jesuit missionary, martyr and saint
- Jean Asselin (ca.1610–1652), a Dutch Golden Age painter and drawer
- Abraham Duquesne (1610–1688), general lieutenant of the French Navy
- Jean Crasset (1618–1692), Jesuit theologian and ascetical writer
- Jean Pecquet (1622–1674), physiologist, wrote on psychology and investigated the thoracic duct
- Charles le Moyne de Longueuil et de Châteauguay, (1626–1685), colonist of New France, first lord of Longueuil
- Richard Simon (1638–1712), priest, biblical critic, orientalist and historian
- Jean Mauger (1648–1712), an ivory engraver and medallist
- Antoine-Augustin Bruzen de La Martinière (1662–1746), polymath, map-writer and scientist
- Gabriel de Clieu (ca.1687–1774), naval officer and the governor of Guadeloupe
- St. Jean de Lalande SJ, a 17th-century Jesuit brother, martyred by the Iroquois Indians in New York State
- Adrien de Pauger (died 1726), engineer and architect of the Vieux Carré at New Orleans
- Catherine Dorothée de Saint-Pierre (born 1743), French writer
- Joseph Lavallée (1747–1816), poet, journalist and novelist
- François-Antoine-Henri Descroizilles (1751–1825), chemist
- Antoine Louis Albitte (1761–1812), Revolutionary politician
- Jean-Louis Albitte (1763–1825), politician, "Albitte the younger"
- Antoine Année (1770–1846), playwright and journalist
- Mary Anne Atwood (1817–1910), an English writer on hermeticism and spiritual alchemy
- Bruno Braquehais (1823–1875), photographer, worked in Paris
- Albert Réville (1826–1906), Protestant theologian with 'extremist' liberal views
- Victor Langlois (1829–1869), historian, archaeologist, professor, numismatist and orientalist
- Camille Saint-Saëns (1835–1921), French composer and pianist
- Maude Valérie White (1855–1937), English composer and songwriter
- Emmanuel Louis Masqueray (1861–1917), Franco-American architect
- Ernest Henri Dubois (1863–1930), sculptor
- Louis Valtat (1869–1952), painter and printmaker associated with the Fauves
- André Alerme (1877–1960), film actor from 1931 to 1952
- Louis de Broglie (1892–1987), Nobel Prize–winning physicist, contributed to quantum theory
- Simonne Vidal (1894–1944), wife and assistant of the historian Marc Bloch
- Mary Odette (1901–1987), silent film actress
- Yvonne Lephay-Belthoise (1914–2011), virtuoso violinist
- Valérie Lemercier (born 1964), actress, screenwriter, director and singer
- Olivier Frébourg (born 1965), journalist, writer and publisher
- Robert Le Bourgeois (born 1969), politician
- Thomas Pesquet (born 1978), astronaut, aerospace engineer and pilot

=== Sport ===
- Albert Clément (1883–1907), motor racing driver
- Jean Rédélé (1922–2007), car racer and founder of the Alpine car factory
- Jéhan Le Roy (1923–1992), equestrian, team bronze medallist at the 1960 Summer Olympics
- Jean-Paul Villain (born 1946), steeplechase runner
- Emmanuel Petit (born 1970), former footballer with 385 club caps and 63 with France
- Laurent Capet (born 1972), volleyball player

== See also ==
- Communes of the Seine-Maritime department
- Dieppe maps
