= Hôtel de Ville, Dieppe =

Town hall in Dieppe, France

Hôtel de Ville
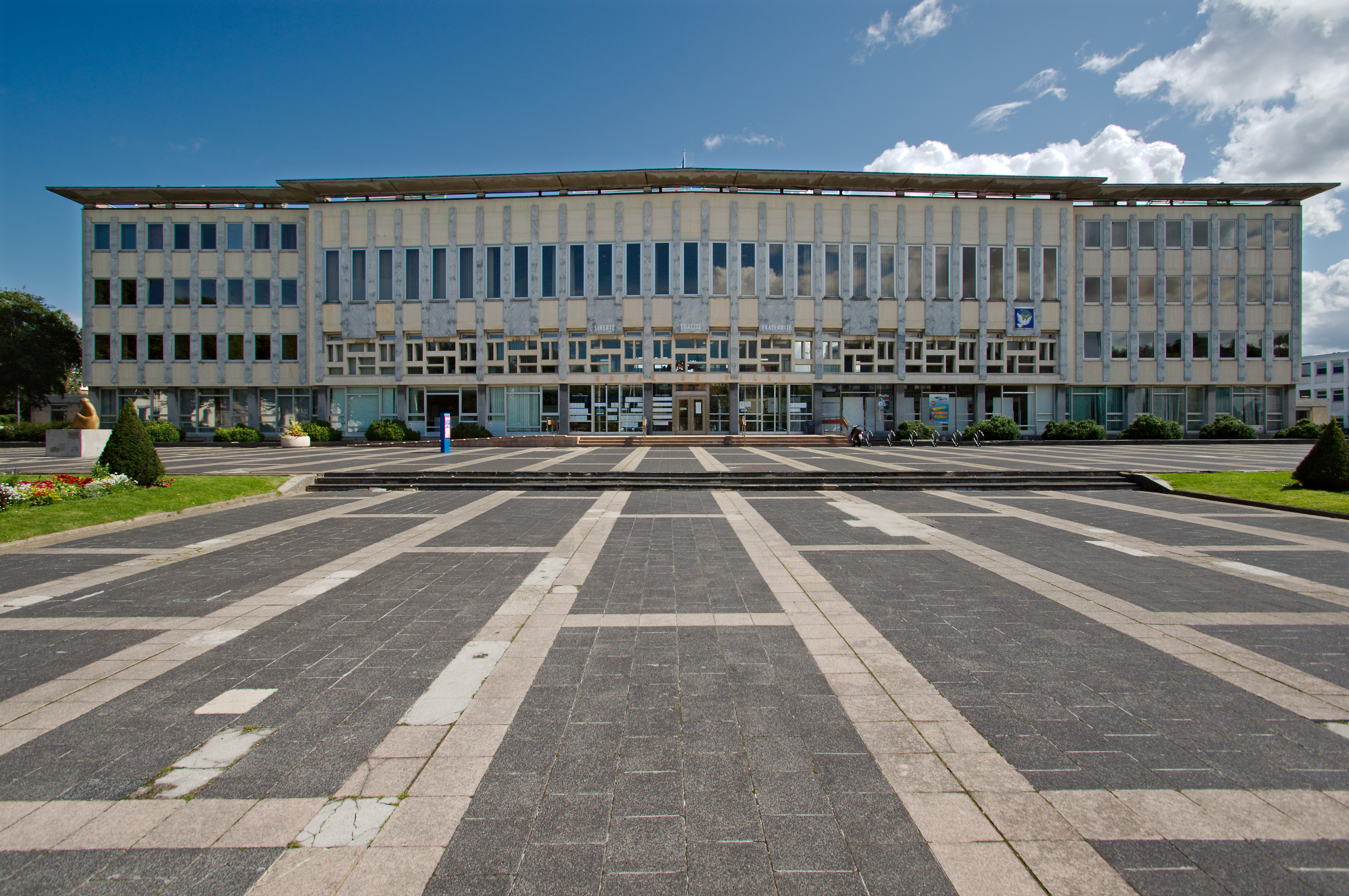
- The main frontage of the Hôtel de Ville in August 2014
- Interactive map of the Hôtel de Ville area

General information
- Type: City hall
- Architectural style: Modern style
- Location: Dieppe, France
- Coordinates: 49.9228°N 1.0776°E
- Completed: 1966

Design and construction
- Architects: René Coulon and Jean-Louis Ludinard

The Hôtel de Ville (French pronunciation: [otɛl də vil], City Hall) is a municipal building in Dieppe, Seine-Maritime, in northern France, standing on Parc Jehan Ango.

== History ==
The first municipal building in the town was the Maison de Ville at No. 8, Quai du Haut-Pavé (now Quai Duquesne) which dated back at least to the mid-14th century. The consuls moved to a building with a bell tower at Place du Moulin-à-Vent in 1396 and then to the fruit market (now Place Nationale) in 1477. An ornate fountain inspired by the work of the engineer, Salomon de Caus, and featuring mechanical singing birds, was installed in front of the town hall to commemorate the visit of Louis XIII in 1617.

After damage to the town hall caused by the Anglo-Dutch naval bombardment in 1694 during the Nine Years' War, the consuls moved to what is now No. 74 Rue d'Écosse. Following the expulsion of the Jesuits by Pope Clement XIV, the consuls moved to the former Jesuits' residence on Rue de la Halle-au-Blé (now Rue du Commandant-Fayolle) in the Saint-Rémy district in December 1767. After the defeat of Napoleon in 1815, a grand reception was held in the town hall to welcome Marie Thérèse, the only surviving daughter of Louis XVI, on her return from exile in Latvia, at the port of Dieppe. A Tree of Liberty was planted in front of the town hall to celebrate the French Second Republic in 1848 and Napoleon III and his wife, Empress Eugénie spent much of their honeymoon living in the town hall in Dieppe in February 1853. The municipal museum was briefly based in the town hall from 1871 to 1876.

In the early 1930s, following significant population growth, the town council decided to commission a modern town hall. The site they selected was in the Bérigny Basin, which had recently been filled in, at the port of Dieppe. Construction of the new building started in March 1935 but was abandoned during the Second World War. Meanwhile the existing town hall was badly damaged by allied naval bombardment during the Dieppe Raid in August 1942 and the council moved to temporary accommodation in a former girls' school at No. 3 Rue Victor-Hugo. Construction of the new building resumed in the early 1960s. It was designed by René Coulon and Jean-Louis Ludinard in the modern style, built in concrete and glass and was officially opened by the mayor, Jean Tournier, on 1 December 1966.

The design involved a long main frontage, slightly projected forward at the centre, facing towards the port of Dieppe. It was laid out in three sections, a central section of 27 bays, and two wings of eight bays each. The ground floor contained a doorway in the central bay, while the rest of the central section featured plate glass on the ground floor, some latticework on the first floor and a series of lancet windows on the second floor. The wings were fenestrated by plate glass on the ground floor and small square windows on the upper floors. Internally, the principal room was the Salle du Conseil (council chamber).

Works of art in the town hall include a fine painting by Gustave Moïse depicting the sinking of the hospital ship, the SS Maid of Kent, by the Luftwaffe in the port of Dieppe during the Second World War.

== Sources ==
- Boudier, André (1938). Dieppe et la région à travers les âges. Les Amys du Vieux-Dieppe.
