= Ave Maria lace =

Rustic lace from Dieppe, Normandy

Ave Maria lace is a lace manufactured until the mid-19th century, largely in Dieppe. The lace is very narrow and was chiefly made by peasants, from whom the name originates.
