= Merville (playwright) =

Merville, real name Pierre-François Camus (1781 in Pontoise – 1853 in Belleville (Seine)) was a 19th-century French Algerian settler who initially worked as a medical doctor, then an actor and finally a playwright.

== Biographie ==
Pierre-François Camus took the surname of his mother, Villemer, which he transformed into Merville as pen name. It is under this pen name that he began in theater. He wrote some thirty-five theatre plays which he signed alone or in collaboration and which were given on the most important Parisian stages (Opéra-Comique, Ambigu-Comique, Second Théâtre-Français, Théâtre de Madame, Favart, Odéon, Porte-Saint-Martin, etc.). All of them were successful. Among these, La Famille Glinet, ou les premiers temps de la ligue was, at that time, popularly discussed in Paris because it was suspected that King Louis XVIII had closely worked on it. This play was a five-act comedy presented for the first time at the Théâtre Favart by the comedians of the Odéon, 18 July 1818.

Merville also wrote three novels: Le Vagabond, histoire contemporaine in 4 volumes (this novel is an exaggeration of the miseries of the people), Le Baron de l'Empire in 5 volumes (this novel tells the story of Charette and some peculiarities of the wars in the Vendée and Jacquot's fate), and Saphorine, ou l'aventurière du Faubourg Saint-Antoine in 2 volumes.

The first published work by Merville is dated 1814. It was Lequel des deux ? ou la Lettre équivoque, comédie en 1 acte, en prose which was the first play to be presented, in Paris, in 1814, on the stage of the Théâtre de l'Odéon.

The latest edition of a work by Merville is dated 1881. It is En revenant de Pontoise. Les Oubliettes de P.-F. Camus dit Merville, réédition annotée. Recherches sur l'origine du dicton, opinions de divers auteurs, recueillies, commentées et publiées par Henri Le Charpentier.

Pierre-François Camus-Merville lived in Villiers-sur-Tholon (Yonne) where he was city councilor from 1846 to 1848. He was a chevalier of the Légion d'honneur.

== Works ==
- Les Comptes de tutelle, comédie-vaudeville in 1 act (with Bayard)
- La Première Affaire, three-act comedy, in prose, Paris, Odéon, 28 August 1827
- Le Savetier de Toulouse, drama in 4 acts (with Francis Cornu], music by M. Adrien), Paris, Ambigu-Comique, 20 October 1832
- Sophie ou le Mauvais ménage, drama in 3 acts (with Francis, music by M. Adrien), Paris, Ambigu-Comique, 2 August 1832
- Le Septuagénaire, ou les Deux Naissances, drama in 4 acts (with Gustave Albitte, music by M. Louis Alexandre Piccinni), Paris, Gaîté, 12 August 1834
- Suite du répertoire du Théâtre de Madame. La Maîtresse (with H. Leroux et Alexis)
- Le Vagabond, histoire contemporaine
- Les Quatre Âges, comedy in verse in 5 acts
- Le Vagabond, histoire contemporaine
- Le Procureur impérial
- Le Félon, historical drama in 3 acts (with *** [Mlle Maucs], music by M. Amédée), Paris, 2 February 1830
- La Grande Duchesse, lyrical drama in 3 acts (with Mélesville, music by M. Carafa, Paris, Opéra-Comique, 16 November 1835
- L'Homme poli, ou la Fausse bienveillance, comedy in 5 acts and in verse, Paris, Second Théâtre-Français, 8 April 1820
- La Maîtresse, comédie-vaudeville in 2 acts (with The Leroux et Alexis), Paris, Théâtre de Madame, 6 May 1829
- Paul Briolat
- Le Jeune Prince, ou la Constitution de ***, comedy in 3 acts, in prose, Paris, Odéon, 7 July 1831
- Lequel des deux ? ou la Lettre équivoque, comedy in 1 act, in prose, Paris, Odéon, 6 September 1814
- En revenant de Pontoise. Les Oubliettes de P.-F. Camus dit Merville, réédition annotée. Recherches sur l'origine du dicton, opinions de divers auteurs, recueillies, commentées et publiées par Henri Le Charpentier
- La Première Affaire, comedy in 3 acts
- Favras, épisode de 1789, in 3 acts (with T. Sauvage), Lyon, Gaîté, 19 May 1831
- À 21 ans, ou l'Agonie de Schönbrünn, one-act drama (with Francis [Cornu]), Paris, Ambigu-Comique, 19 August 1832
- Almanach des spectacles, Paris, 1822
- La Boiteuse
- Le Baron de l'Empire
- Les Comptes de tutelle, comédie-vaudeville in 1 act (with Bayard), Paris, Théâtre de Madame, 15 June 1826
- Les Cent-et-une nouvelles nouvelles des Cent-et-un, adorned with a hundred-and-one vignettes
- Contes et nouvelles
- Le Contrariant, comedy in prose, in 1 act, Paris, Odéon, 28 December 1828
- Les Deux Apprentis
- L'Écrivain public, drama in 3 acts, in prose (with Drouineau), Paris, Porte-Saint-Martin, 10 May 1828
- Tom-Rick, ou le Babouin, play in three acts imitated from English (with Francis Cornu and Alexandre [Armand d'Artois]), Paris, Porte-Saint-Martin, 16 October 1832
- Jean-Bart à Versailles, historical fact in 1 act, mingled with couplets (with Maréchalle), Paris, Gaîté, 1 March 1817
- La Famille Glinet, ou les premiers temps de la ligue, five-act comedy
- Louis XIII, ou la Conspiration de Cinq-Mars, historical drama in 5 acts (with P. Tournemine), J. A. Lelong
- Le Juif errant, drame fantastique in 5 acts and 1 epilogue, with new choirs (with Mallian, music by M. Paris)
- Les Deux Anglais, comedy in 3 acts and in prose, Paris, Odéon, 3 July 1817
- Saphorine, ou l'Aventurière du faubourg Saint-Antoine, 2 vol., Paris, Barba 1820.
