= Jean-Louis Albitte =

French politician

Jean-Louis Albitte (25 April 1763, Dieppe, Seine-Maritime – 3 February 1825, Reims) was a French politician.

== Life ==
Born into a merchant family in Dieppe, he joined the family business. He and his brother Antoine Louis Albitte (a deputy to the Legislative Assembly) sought election to the National Convention (Jean-Louis was known as "Albitte the younger" to distinguish him from his elder brother). He was also elected to the Convention as a 'suppléant' for Seine-Maritime on 12 September 1792 and on 15 December the following year he was summoned to sit in the Convention following the death of Pierre Philippe Doublet.

Unlike his fiery elder brother, Jean-Louis took little or no active part in the Convention and only spoke once, defending his brother on 20 May 1795 after Antoine's arrest. The end of the Convention also marked the end of Jean-Louis' political career, though a few years later he became a lottery inspector under the First French Empire and the Bourbon Restoration.

== Bibliography ==
- "Jean-Louis Albitte" in Robert and Cougny, Dictionnaire des parlementaires français, 1889
