= Armand Séville =

French journalist, novelist, chansonnier, poet and playwright

Charles-Victor Armand called Armand Séville (? – 1847) was a 19th-century French journalist, novelist, chansonnier, poet and playwright.

A collaborator of the Journal de Paris, a member of the Soupers de Momus, he was one of the co-founders of the Enfants du Caveau (1834) or Société des Joyeux, of which he became general secretary. Chief editor of the Mentor (1824), his plays were presented on the most significant Parisian stages of the 19th century: Théâtre du Vaudeville, Théâtre de la Gaité, and more. Armand also published novels under the pen name Pascal Thorre.

== Works ==
- 1801: Le Quaterne, vaudeville in 1 act, in prose
- 1804: Le Café du ventriloque, folie-vaudeville in 1 act, in prose
- 1805: Un quart d'heure dramatique, folie-vaudeville
- 1805: J'essaie, monologue mixed with vaudevilles
- 1805: Le Porte-feuille galant, a collection dedicated to the ladies
- 1806: Le Dernier Bulletin, ou la Paix, impromptu mixed with vaudevilles
- 1806: Métusko, ou les Polonais, melodrama in 3 acts, extravaganza
- 1811: Grammaire française, with Charles François Lhomond
- 1813: Laissez-moi faire, ou la Soubrette officieuse, vaudeville in 1 act
- 1813: Précis de l'histoire de France, depuis l'établissement de la monarchie jusqu'au règne de Napoléon Ier
- 1814: Salut au Roi, with Casimir Ménestrier and Paul Ledoux
- 1814: L'Élan du cœur, hommage au roi Louis XVIII, with Ménestrier
- 1814: Chansonnier des joyeux
- 1815: L'Habit de cour, ou le Moraliste de nouvelle étoffe
- 1817: Elémens de la grammaire Française, with Lhomond
- 1826: La Liquidation, comédie en vaudevilles in 1 act and in prose, with Benjamin Antier
- 1826: La Famille Girard, ou les Prisonniers français, tableau militaire-anecdote in 1 act, with Louis Portelette
- 1826: Le Forçat libéré, mélodrama in three acts, with Francis Cornu
- 1833: Les Bariolés, novel, 2 vols.
- 1834: L'Orme aux loups, novel

== Bibliography ==
- Joseph-François et Louis-Gabriel Michaud, Biographie universelle, ancienne et moderne, 1849, p. 179-180
- Joseph Marie Quérard, Les supercheries littéraires dévoilées, vol.5, 1853, p. 77
- Violette Leduc, Antony Méray, Bibliographie des chansons, fabliaux..., 1859, p. 44
