= Notre-Dame-de-Bon-Secours Chapel of Dieppe =

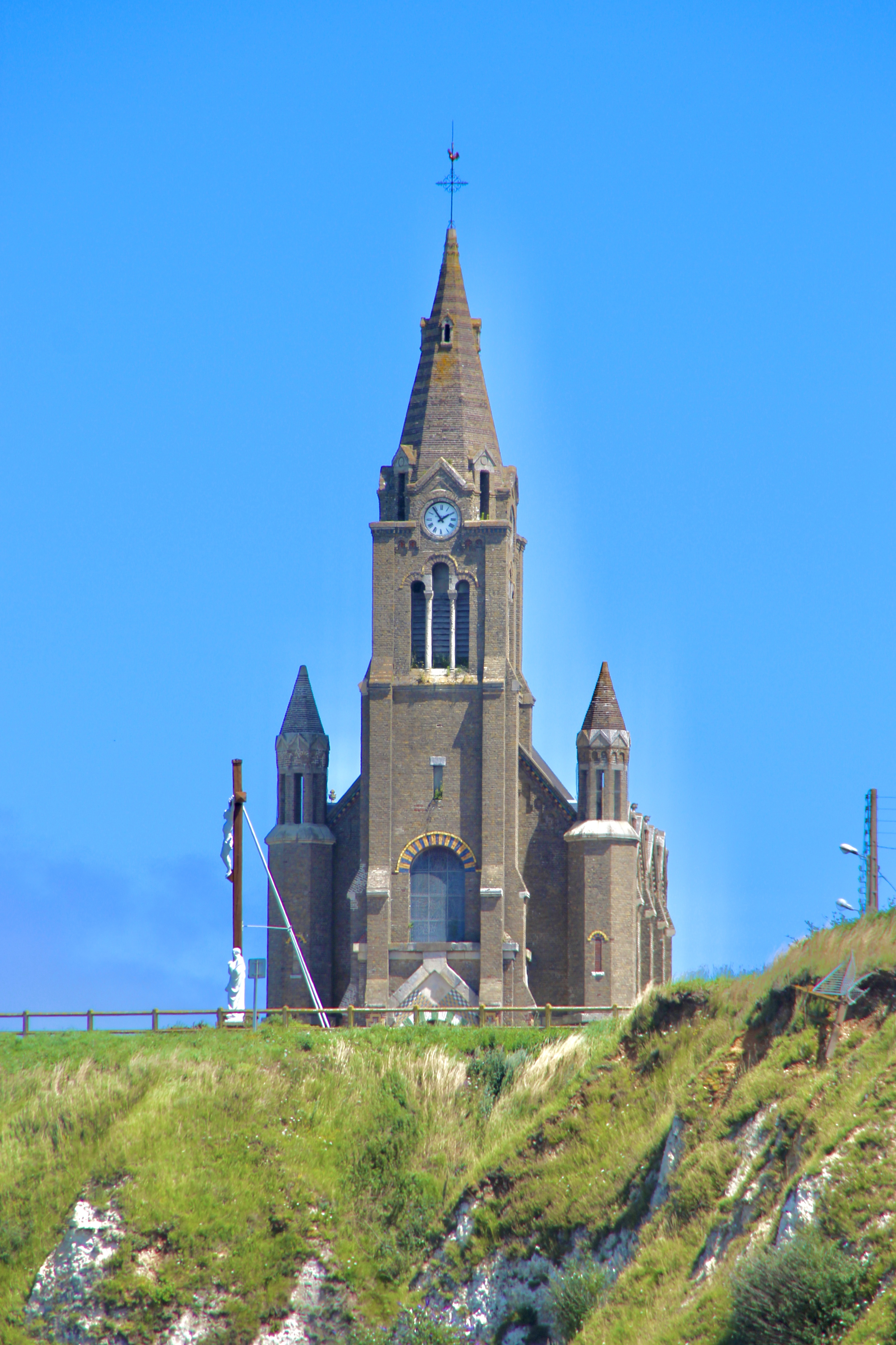
- View of the chapel portal in 2012

Religion
- Affiliation: Catholic
- Ecclesiastical or organizational status: active
- Leadership: Roman Catholic Archdiocese of Rouen

Location
- Location: Dieppe, France
- Interactive map of Notre-Dame-de-Bon-Secours Chapel of Dieppe

Architecture
- Type: Church
- Style: Gothic Revival architecture
- Completed: 1876

The Notre-Dame-de-Bon-Secours chapel in Dieppe was built in 1876 for sailors who died at sea. It was first a place of pilgrimage before being a parish church, and stands on the coast of the English Channel.

Many votive offerings on display here honor the memory of sailors lost at sea. It was built by a mutual aid society before being attached to the parish of Neuville-lès-Dieppe in 1914.

The church is part of the Roman Catholic Archdiocese of Rouen.

== History ==
Sailors from Dieppe in the 19th century were famous for their piety and local pride, both of which are generally attributed to the harshness of their line of work. They and their community were predominantly Marianist at the time the chapel was constructed, and that influence is still apparent in the beliefs and traditions of the area today. A Norman sailor's eulogy attributed to the community that dates back to the seventeenth century describes the dangers of a sailor's life at the time.

=== The Dieppe Tradition of Baptizing Fishing Boats ===
It is tradition amongst the fishermen of Dieppe to baptize their boats, a practice that has become part of the chapel's responsibilities. Each boat is blessed with the patronage of a particular saint. This practice can also be found in the western province of Breize and the Isles of Ponant, and was sometimes a cause for pilgrimages and celebrations in its own right.

=== Votive Model Boats ===
The votive offerings of the Notre-Dame-de-Bon-Secours chapel are unique in that they are shaped like miniature boats. Fishermen have traditionally created these in likeness of their own crafts, and offer them to the Virgin Mary before they set sail to ensure her protection at sea. These are left near the chapel's biblical statue of the crowned virgin slaying a dragon.

=== Stained Glass Windows ===
The chapel's stained glass windows are relatively modest, and bear witness to the Neo-Gothic style that was popularized at the end of the nineteenth century by French architect Eugène Viollet-le-Duc as a return to Middle Ages. The stonework is done in the same style.

== See also ==
- Dieppe
- Gothic Revival style
