= Antoine Louis Albitte =

French politician (1761–1812)

- Born: Antoine Louis Albitte; 30 December 1761; Dieppe, Province of Normandy, France
- Died: 23 December 1812 (aged 50); Raseiniai, Lithuania
- Occupations: French Revolutionary politician and army officer
- Employer(s): Legislative Assembly and the National Convention
- Parent(s): François-Antoine Albitte and Marie Barbe Bourdon

Antoine Louis Albitte (30 December 1761, Dieppe, Seine-Maritime – 23 December 1812, Raseiniai) was a French Revolutionary politician. He was deputy for Seine-Inférieure in the Legislative Assembly and the National Convention, where he was known as "Albitte the elder" to distinguish him from his brother Jean-Louis Albitte - he sat there from pluviôse, Year II. He also fought as an officer in the French Revolutionary Wars and Napoleonic Wars - he died of cold, fatigue and hunger on the retreat from Russia after three days of suffering.

== Life ==
Born into a merchant family in Dieppe, as the son of François-Antoine Albitte "former guard of the king" and Marie Barbe Bourdon. His first cousin was Pierre Nicolas Étienne Langlois (1756-1819), who would be deputy for Seine-Inférieure in the Legislative Assembly. He was the illicit lover in an affair of Mrs. Ducastel, whose husband was also a legislature deputy. He studied at the town's Oratorian college before studying law in Rouen, where he became a lawyer. He set up home in Dieppe and became a freemason
