= Pierre Philippe Doublet =

French politician (1745–1793)

Pierre Philippe Doublet (3 April 1745, in Bois-d'Ennebourg – 26 November 1793, in La Force Prison, Paris) was a French politician of the French Revolution.

== Life ==
Working as a labourer in Londinieres, he was elected in Londinieres on 9 September 1792 as a member of the National Convention for Seine-Inférieure - he was thirteenth out of 16 by number of votes. He sat with the moderates and during the trial of Louis XVI he voted for imprisonment until the end of the war and then banishment. He was one of 75 deputies who between 6 and 19 June 1793 signed protests against the revolt of 2 June 1793. He fell under suspicion during the Reign of Terror and was arrested on 4 October 1793, dying in prison the following month.
