= Francis Cornu =

French playwright (1794–1848)

- Born: 4 October 1794; Château de Montgazon, Saint-Franchy (Nièvre)
- Died: 7 March 1848 (aged 53); Paris
- Occupation: Playwright

Francis Cornu (4 October 1794 – 7 March 1848) was a French playwright.

== Biography ==
After he made excellent studies in Paris, he lost his father and at the young age of 17, had to work for a living. He entered as an employee at the prefecture of Nièvre. In 1815, suspected of supporting the Bourbons, he was removed from office. He then entered into business house then into a bank where he became chief clerk.

Having already composed verses in Latin, he made his debut in 1816 in Lyon in the vaudeville genre. In 1819, he moved to Paris and worked again first as a bank clerk (1819-1825). His first plays did not get any success. Le forçat libéré in 1829, performed at the Ambigu-Comique was even booed. Finally, it is Isaure which was met with success that made him known.

His plays, including many in collaboration with Auguste Anicet-Bourgeois, will then be regularly performed on the most important Parisian stages of the 19th century: Théâtre du Gymnase dramatique, Théâtre de l'Ambigu-Comique, Théâtre des Variétés etc.

In 1841, he became managing director of the Theatre at Antwerp.

== Works ==
- La suite de je fais mes farces, vaudeville, 1816
- L'Enfant de Paris ou le débit de consolations, lithographies in action, with Armand d'Artois and Gabriel de Lurieu, 1823
- Partie et revanche, comédie en vaudevilles in 1 act, with Nicolas Brazier and Eugène Scribe, 1823
- Les Acteurs à l’auberge, comedy in 1 act, with Maurice Alhoy and Armand-François Jouslin de La Salle, 1825
- Isaure, drame en 3 actes, mingled with song, with Benjamin Antier and Théodore Nézel, 1829
- Le Forçat libéré, melodrama in three acts, with Armand Séville, 1829
- Napoléon, historical play in three parts, mingled with songs, with Auguste Anicet-Bourgeois, 1830
- Une nuit au Palais-Royal, ou la Garde nationale en 1830, tableau-vaudeville, with A. Bourgeois, 1830
- La Belle-Fille, comédie en vaudevilles in 1 act, with A. Bourgeois, 1831
- Le Boa, ou le Bossu à la mode, comédie en vaudevilles in 1 act, with Achille d'Artois, 1831
- Les Chouans, ou Coblentz et Quiberon, drama in 3 acts, with A. Bourgeois, 1831
- Le Grenadier de l'île d'Elbe, play in three acts, mingled with songs, with A.Bourgeois, 1831
- Jeannette, melodrama in three acts and 6 periods, with A. Bourgeois, 1831
- Le Nouveau Sargines, ou l'École des malins, vaudeville in 1 act, 1831
- Le savetier de Toulouse, drama in 4 acts, 1832
- Les Deux diligences, comédie en vaudevilles in 1 act, with A. Bourgeois, 1832
- Franklin à Passy ou le Bonhomme Richard, vaudeville anecdotique en 1 act, with Frédéric de Courcy, 1832
- Sophie, ou le Mauvais ménage, drama in three acts, with Merville, 1832
- Tom-Rick, ou le Babouin, play in three acts, with Armand d'Artois, 1832
- La Chanoinesse, vaudeville in one act, with Eugène Scribe, 1833
- Le Festin de Balthazar, sacred drama in 5 acts, mingled with chorus, with Gustave Robillard, 1833
- Indiana, drama in 5 parts, with Léon Halévy, 1833
- Valentine ou Le Château de la Ferme, melodrama in five acts, with Guilbert de Pixérécourt, 1834
- Les mineurs, melodrama in three acts, with A. Bourgeois, 1835
- Héloïse et Abeilard, drama in five acts, with Auguste Anicet-Bourgeois, 1836
- Nabuchodonosor, drama in four acts, with A. Bourgeois and Pierre Elzéar, 1836
- Le spectre et l'orpheline, drama in four acts, with A. Bourgeois, 1836
- Jérusalem délivrée, play in 4 acts and 10 tableaux, 1836
- Austerlitz, événement historique in three periods and eight tableaux, 1837
- Pauvre mère !, drama in five acts, with Hippolyte Auger, 1837
- L’Élève de Saint-Cyr, drama in five acts, 1838
- Le Château de Saint-Germain, drama in five acts, with Léon Halévy, 1840
- Les Chevilles de maître Adam, menuisier de Nevers, ou les Poètes artisans, 1-act comedy, mingled with couplets, 1841
- Marie ou l'Inondation, drama un five acts and six tableaux, with Auguste Anicet-Bourgeois, 1846

== Bibliography ==
- Felix Delhasse, Annuaire dramatique de la Belgique, vol.4, 1842, (p. 114)
- Victor Couailhac, La vie de théâtre, 1864, (pp. 206–207)
- Jules Guex, Le Théâtre et la société française: de 1815 à 1848, 1900, (p. 115)
- Simone Bernard-Griffiths, Jean Sgard, Mélodrames et romans noirs: 1750–1890, 2000, (p. 279)
