= Auguste Anicet-Bourgeois =

French dramatist

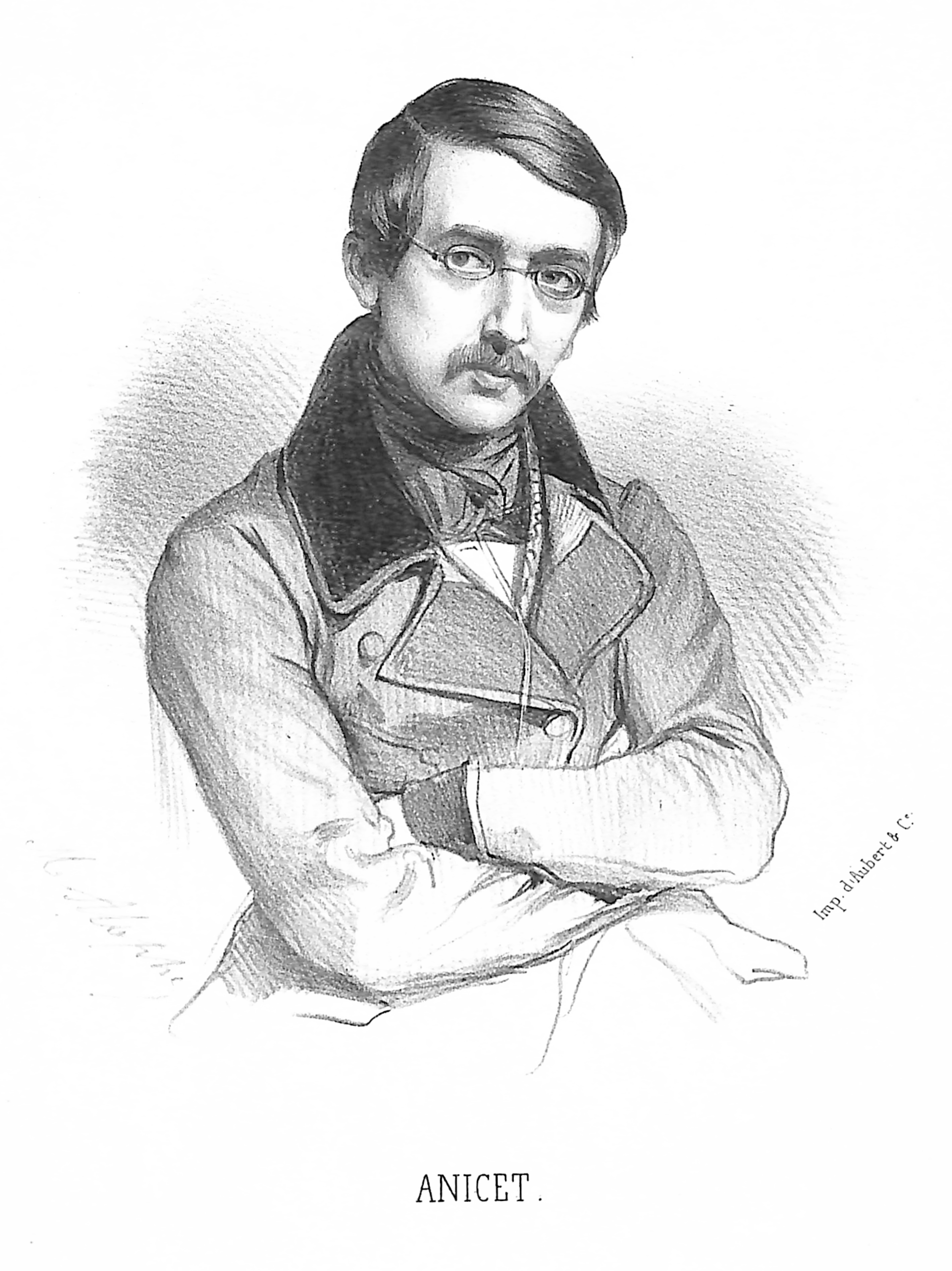
Auguste Anicet-Bourgeois, 1880

Auguste Anicet, later Auguste Anicet-Bourgeois (25 December 1806 – 12 January 1871) was a French dramatist. He was born in Paris.

The first play to bear his name is L'Ami et le mari, ou le Nouvel Amphitryon, a vaudeville piece in one act. It was produced in 1825, when the author was still in his teens.

Over the course of his career he was credited with writing nearly 200 plays, as many as ten a year. However the nature of theatrical collaboration at this time was such that the extent of his contribution to any given play is debatable. In fact it is known that he assisted Alexandre Dumas in the writing of several plays (Térésa, Angèle, Le Mari de la Veuve, La Vénitienne), sometimes without acknowledgement. He is the subject of an anecdote in Dumas's "Comment je devins auteur dramatique" ("How I became a Dramatist"), in an extract published in 1833 in Revue des Deux Mondes about a proposal to stage a play featuring Caligula's horse. Other writers with whom he worked were Philippe Dumanoir, Julien de Mallian, Victor Ducange, Francis Cornu, Lockroy, Édouard Brisebarre, Michel Masson, Ernest Blum and Paul Féval. One of his plays was adapted for the English stage as The Black Doctor (1846), a vehicle for Ira Aldridge.

Very little is known of his life beyond a connection to the military. Married, with one daughter, he was named Chevalier de la Légion d'honneur on 10 December 1849. He died on 12 January 1871 at Pau, Pyrénées-Atlantiques (a fortnight before the end of the Siege of Paris) and was buried in division 4 of Père-Lachaise.
