= Michel-Joseph Gentil de Chavagnac =

French chansonnier and playwright

Michel-Joseph Gentil de Chavagnac, full name Adolphe Michel Joseph Gentil de Chavagnac, (Paris, 3 July 1770 – Passy, 27 May 1846) was a 19th-century French chansonnier and playwright.

== Biography ==
After a career in the army, he became known in theater as Marc-Antoine Madeleine Désaugiers's collaborator with whom he published more than thirty plays.

Managing director of the Théâtre de l'Odéon in 1821-1822, he also was Private Secretary to the Director of Water and Forests (1822), a founding member of the Caveau moderne, and honorary reader of the King (Charles X) from 1823 to 1830. His plays, often circumstantial, were presented on the most important Parisian stages of his time, including the Théâtre des Variétés, the Théâtre de la Porte-Saint-Martin, the Théâtre du Vaudeville, the Théâtre de l'Opéra-Comique etc.

== Works ==
- La Comédie chez l'épicier, ou le Manuscrit retrouvé, vaudeville-anecdote in 1 act, with Désaugiers, 1808
- La Jeunesse de Favart, comédie anecdotique in 1 act, in prose, mingled with vaudevilles, with Antoine-Pierre-Charles Favart, 1808
- Hector ou Le valet de carreau, jeu de cartes in 5 parts, with Désaugiers and Rougemont, 1809
- M. La Gobe, ou Un jour de carnaval, folie-vaudeville in 1 act, with Désaugiers, 1809
- La petite Cendrillon ou La chatte merveilleuse, folie-vaudeville in 1 act, with Désaugiers, 1810
- Les sabotiers béarnais ou La faute d'orthographe, vaudeville in 1 act, in prose, with Commagny, 1810
- Les Fêtes françaises, ou Paris en miniature, entertainment in 1 act, with Michel-Nicolas Balisson de Rougemont, 1810
- La petite gouvernante, comedy in 2 acts and in prose, mingled with vaudevilles, with Charles-François-Jean-Baptiste Moreau de Commagny, 1811
- L'ogresse ou La belle au bois dormant, vaudeville-folie-comi-parade in 1 act, with Désaugiers, 1811
- La Bonne nouvelle, ou le Premier arrivé, vaudeville in 1 act, 1811
- Bayard à La Ferté ou Le siège de Mézières, opéra comique in 2 acts, with Désaugiers, 1811
- Les auvergnats ou L'eau et le vin, vaudeville grivois in 1 act, with Désaugiers, 1812
- La matrimoniomanie, comedy in 1 act, with Rougemont and Désaugiers, 1812
- Monsieur Désornières, ou Faut-il rire ? faut-il pleurer ? folie in 1 act and in vaudevilles, with Désaugiers, 1812
- Pierrot ou Le diamant perdu, comédie-vaudeville in 2 acts, with Désaugiers, 1813
- Le Bûcheron de Salerne ou Les Souhaits, comedy-féerie in 1 act, mingled with vaudevilles, with Désaugiers, 1814
- L'Hôtel garni, ou la Leçon singulière, comedy in 1 act, with Désaugiers, 1814
- Le Petit enfant prodigue, comedy in 1 act, mingled with vaudevilles, with Désaugiers, 1814
- Le Sabre de bois, ou la Revue du roi, comedy in 1 act, mingled with vaudevilles, with Rougemont, 1814
- Le Retour des lys, à-propos in 1 act and in vaudeville, with Désaugiers, 1814
- L'Île de l'espérance, ou le Songe réalisé, allegorical play in 1 act, mingled with vaudevilles, with Désaugiers et Brazier, 1814
- Une journée au camp, comical melodrama in 2 acts, mingled with vaudevilles, with Désaugiers, 1815
- Les Deux voisines ou Les Prêtés rendus, comedy in 1 act, with Désaugiers, 1815
- Le Vaudeville en vendanges, petit à-propos villageois in 1 act, mingled with couplets, with Désaugiers and Commagny, 1815
- Le Bouquet du Roi, ou le Marché aux fleurs, à propos in 1 act, mingled with vaudevilles, with Désaugiers, 1815
- Monsieur Sans-Gêne ou L'ami de collège, vaudeville in 1 act, with Désaugiers, 1816
- Mariage de Mgr le duc de Berri, with Désaugiers, 1816
- Le Dix-sept juin, ou l'Heureuse journée, à-propos in 1 act, mingled with vaudevilles, with Désaugiers, 1816
- Les Visites bourgeoises, ou le Dehors et le dedans, little sketch of a grand scene, in 1 act, mingled with couplets, with Désaugiers and Commagny, 1816
- Chacun son tour, ou l'Écho de Paris, divertissement villageois in vaudevilles, with de Chazet and Désaugiers, 1816
- Chansons chantées aux Champs-Élysées pour la fête du roi, le 25 August 1817, with Désaugiers and Jacques-André Jacquelin, 1817
- Je fais mes farces, folie in 1 act, mingled with couplets, with Brazier et Désaugiers, 1817
- La Petite coquette, comédie-vaudeville in 1 act, with Désaugiers, 1817
- La Vendange normande, ou les Deux voisins, vaudeville in 1 act, with Alexandre Barrière, 1817
- Les Anniversaires des trois mai et huit juillet, with Marc-Antoine Désaugiers, 1818
- La Statue de Henri IV, ou la Fête du Pont-Neuf, tableau grivois in 1 act, with de Chazet, Désaugiers and Joseph Pain, 1818
- Couplets pour l'inauguration de la statue de Henri IV chantés à la représentation de l'Académie royale de musique, 24 August 1818, with Désaugiers, 1818
- Les Deux Valentin, ou les Nouveaux Ménechmes, comédie-vaudeville in 1 act, with Désaugiers, 1818
- Le bucheron de Salerne ou Les trois souhaits, 1819
- Les Petites Danaïdes, ou 99 victimes, imitation burlesco-tragi-comi-diabolico-féerie of the opera the Danaïdes , mingled with vaudevilles, danses, with Désaugiers, 1819
- Le Prêté rendu, comédie mêlée de couplets, with Rougemont and Mélesville, 1819
- Le jeune Werther, ou Les grandes passions, vaudeville in 1 act, with Désaugiers, 1819
- Le Berceau du prince, ou les Dames de Bordeaux, à-propos vaudeville in 1 act, with Nicolas Brazier, René de Chazet, Désaugiers and Jean-Baptiste Dubois, 1820
- Scènes en l'honneur de la naissance de Mgr le duc de Bordeaux, with Désaugiers, 1820
- Un Dîner à Pantin, ou l'Amphytrion à la diète, tableau-vaudeville in 1 act, with Désaugiers and Nicolas Gersin, 1820
- Le Baptême de village, ou le Parrain de circonstance, vaudeville in 1 act, with de Bury, Ledoux de la Croisette and Désaugiers, 1821
- Les Étrennes du vaudeville, ou la Pièce impromptu, folie-parade in 1 act, mingled with couplets, with Désaugiers and Francis baron d'Allarde, 1821
- Vadeboncoeur, ou le Retour au village, vaudeville in 1 act, with Désaugiers, 1822
- Une visite aux Invalides, à-propos mingled with couplets, with de Bury and Ledoux, 1822
- Le comte d'Angoulême, ou Le siège de Gênes, with Fulgence de Bury, Paul Ledoux and Ramond de la Croisette, 1823
- Les maris sans femmes ou une heure de paternité, vaudeville in 1 act, with Désaugiers, 1823
- M. Oculi, ou la Cataracte, imitation burlesque de Valérie , in 1 act and in vaudevilles, with Désaugiers, 1823
- Plus de Pyrénées, à-propos-vaudeville in 1 act, with Désaugiers, 1823
- La Route de Bordeaux, à-propos in 1 act and in free verses, with Désaugiers and Gersin, 1823
- Chansons pour la S. Louis, with Frédéric de Courcy, 1824
- Fenêtres à louer, ou les Deux propriétaires, vaudeville in 1 act, with Désaugiers, 1825
- Les petites danaïdes, 1846
- Recueil de chansons et poésies fugitives, undated
- Stances sur la naissance du roi de Rome, undated
- La Cause et les effets (et autres chansons royalistes), with Désaugiers, undated
- Le siége de Gênes, comédie héroïque in 2 acts, with de Bury et Ledoux, undated

== Bibliography ==
- François Xavier de Feller, Biographie universelle, 1850, (p. 75) (Read online)
- Béatrice Didier, Le XVIIIe siècle: 1778-1820, vol.3, 1976, (p. 322)
- Jean-Louis Tamvaco, Ivor Forbes Guest, Les cancans de l'Opéra, 2000, (p. 21)
