= Pierre Lafon =

French actor (1773–1846)

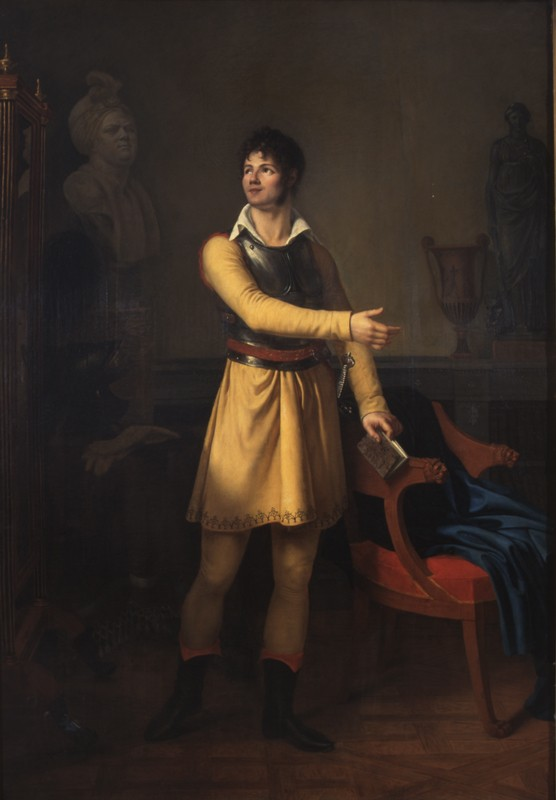
- Eugénie Delaporte, Pierre Lafon, dans le costume de Tancrède, répétant son rôle dans sa loge, Salon de 1802, Stockholm

Pierre Rapenouille, known professionally as Pierre Lafon, was a French dramatic actor born in Lalinde, France on September 1, 1773.

== Biography ==
At 19 years old, Lafon wrote a drama in five actes called La Mort d'Hercule. It was later performed in Bordeaux in 1793.

In 1800, he joined the Comédie-Française where be became known under the name "Lafon des Français."

In his day, Pierre Lafon was among Paris's best respected dramatic actors. « Le beau Lafon » as he was known, quickly eclipsed the great Talma. Lafon's physical beauty and talent as an actor made him a favorite of women, notably Pauline Bonaparte.

Lafon made his final stage appearance in 1839, after which he retired to his daughter's home in Bordeaux. He died on May 10, 1846.

== Career at the Comédie-Française ==
Lafon joined in 1800 and was named a sociétaires of the Comédie-Française that same year. He left the theater in 1830.

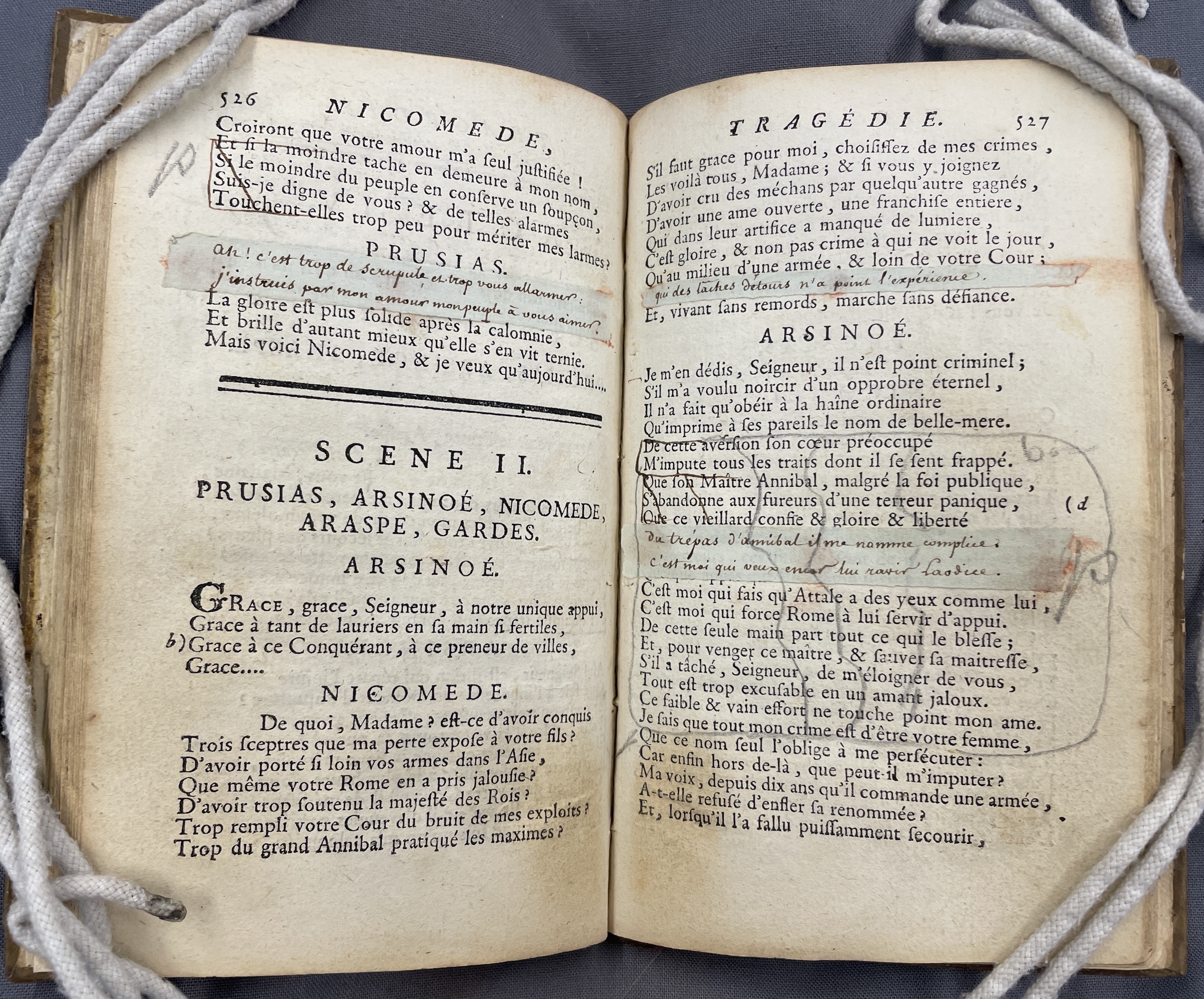
Lafon's prompt copy of Nicomède

His roles included:

- 1800: Orestes in Andromaque by Jean Racine, Comédie-Française
- 1800: Nero in Britannicus by Jean Racine, Comédie-Française
- 1800: Achilles in Iphigénie by Jean Racine, Comédie-Française
- 1801: Alhamar in Alhamar by François-Joseph Depuntis, Comédie-Française
- 1801: Pharnace in Mithridate by Jean Racine, Comédie-Française
- 1802: Clodoër in Isule et Orovèse by Népomucène Lemercier, Comédie-Française
- 1802: Don Léon in Le Roi et le laboureur by Antoine-Vincent Arnault, Comédie-Française
- 1803: Le Tasse in Le Tasse by A. M. Cecile, Comédie-Française
- 1803: Suleiman in Les Trois Sultanes ou Soliman II by Charles-Simon Favart, Comédie-Française
- 1803: Thurson in Siri-Brahé ou les Curieuses by Henry Joseph Thurind de Ryss, Comédie-Française
- 1804: Harpage in Cyrus by Marie-Joseph Chénier, Comédie-Française
- 1805: Aman in Esther by Jean Racine
- 1805: Philip IV of France in Les Templiers by François Just Marie Raynouard :
- 1806: Abner in Athalie by Jean Racine
- 1806: d'Épernon in La Mort de Henri IV, roi de France by Gabriel-Marie Legouvé
- 1806: Alceste in Le Misanthrope by Molière
- 1806: Nero in Octavie by Jean-Marie Siouriguères de Saint-Marc
- 1807: Caurellée La Mort de Du Guesclin by Hyacinthe Dorvo
- 1807: Nicomède in Nicomède by Pierre Corneille
- 1807: Brueys in Brueys et Palaprat by Charles-Guillaume Étienne
- 1807: the prince in Le Paravent by Eugène de Planard
- 1807: Antiochus in Rodogune by Pierre Corneille
- 1808: Artaxerce in Artaxerce by Étienne-Joseph-Bernard Delrieu
- 1809: Pâris in Hector by Jean-Charles-Julien Luce de Lancival
- 1809: Licinius in Vitellie by A. de Selve
- 1810: Thierry in Brunehaut ou les Successeurs de Clovis by Étienne Aignan
- 1811: Nicomède in Annibal by A. J. Denormandie
- 1814: Henri de Bourbon, roi de Navarre in Les États de Blois ou La Mort du duc de Guise by François Just Marie Raynouard
- 1815: Démétrius in Démétrius by Étienne-Joseph-Bernard Delrieu
- 1816: Charlemagne in Charlemagne by Népomucène Lemercier
- 1819: Pyrrhus in Hécube et Polyxène by Pierre-François-Xavier Bourguignon d'Herbigny
- 1819: Talbot in Jeanne d'Arc à Rouen by Charles-Joseph Robillard d'Avrigny
- 1819: Louis IX in Louis IX by Jacques-François Ancelot
- 1820: the Regent in Jean de Bourgogne by Guilleau de Formont
- 1823: Burrhus in Britannicus by Jean Racine
- 1823: Don Pèdre in Pierre de Portugal by Lucien Arnault
- 1824: Shore in Richard III et Jeanne Shore by Népomucène Lemercier
- 1824: Eudore in Eudore et Cymodocée by Gary
- 1825: David in La Clémence de David by Victor Draparnaud
- 1825: Tiberius in Bélisaire by Étienne de Jouy
- 1825: Sigismund in Sigismond de Bourgogne by Jean-Pons-Guillaume Viennet
- 1825: Leroi in Le Béarnais by Ramond de la Croisette, Fulgence de Bury, and Paul Ledoux
- 1825: Démarate in Léonidas by Michel Pichat
- 1826: Clisson in Charles VI by Alexandre-Jean-Joseph de La Ville de Mirmont
- 1826: Odon in Le Siège de Paris by Charles-Victor Prévot, vicomte d'Arlincourt
- 1826: Maillard in Marcel by Michel-Nicolas Balisson de Rougemont
- 1827: Joad in Athalie by Jean Racine
- 1827: Julien in Julien dans les Gaules by Étienne de Jouy
- 1827: Icilius in Virginie by Alexandre Guiraud
- 1829: the Duke of Nottingham in Élisabeth d'Angleterre by Jacques-François Ancelot
