= Théodore Anne =

French playwright, librettist, and novelist (1797–1869)

- Born: 7 April 1797; Rouen
- Died: 12 August 1869 (aged 72); Paris
- Occupations: ¨Playwright, librettist, novelist
- Years active: 1818 – 1863

Théodore Anne (7 April 1797 – 12 August 1869) was a French playwright, librettist, and novelist.

Anne joined the army in 1814, and served as a member of the compagnie de Noailles until 1830 when, in the wake of the July Revolution, being still faithful to the Bourbons, he resigned.

An editor at the journal La France, a drama critic for the L'Union journal and a collaborator with Revue et gazette des théâtres, he authored numerous plays which were presented on the most significant Parisian stages of the 19th century: Théâtre du Vaudeville, Théâtre de la Gaité, Théâtre de l'Ambigu-Comique, Académie royale de musique, Théâtre des Nouveautés etc.

== Works ==
- 1818: Le Fureteur, ou l'Anti-Minerve
- 1820: Éloge historique du duc de Berri
- 1822: Le Coq de village, tableau-vaudeville in 1 act, by Charles-Simon Favart, given to the theatre with modifications, with Eugène Hyacinthe Laffillard
- 1824: Alfred, ou la Bonne Tête ! !, vaudeville in 1 act, with Achille d'Artois
- 1824: Les Deux officiers, vaudeville in 1 act, with Achille d'Artois
- 1824: La Rue du Carrousel, ou le Musée en boutique, vaudeville in 1 act, with Espérance Hippolyte Lassagne
- 1825: La Saint-Henri, divertissement, with Achille d'Artois, music by Felice Blangini
- 1825: Les Châtelaines, ou les Nouvelles Amazones, vaudeville in 1 act, with Achille d'Arbois
- 1825: L'Exilé, vaudeville in 2 acts, from Old Mortality, by Walter Scott, with Achille d'Artois and Henri de Tully
- 1825: L'Intendant et le garde-chasse, vaudeville, with Marc-Antoine Désaugiers, music by Felice Blangini
- 1825: Madrid, ou Observations sur les mœurs et usages des Espagnols, au commencement du XIXe siècle, with Mathurin-Joseph Brisset
- 1826: Le Dilettante, ou le Siège de l'Opéra, folie-vaudeville in 5 small acts, with Jean-Baptiste Gondelier and Emmanuel Théaulon
- 1826: Le Pari, vaudeville in 1 act, with Adolphe Jadin
- 1827: Le Courrier des théâtres, ou la Revue à franc-étrier, folie-vaudevile in 5 relais, with Jean-Baptiste Gondelier and Emmanuel Théaulon
- 1827: La Girafe ou Une journée au jardin du Roi, Tableau-à-propos in vaudevilles, with Gondelier and Théaulon
- 1827: L'Orpheline et l'héritière, comédie en vaudevilles in 2 acts, with Henri de Tully
- 1828: Le Barbier châtelain, ou la Loterie de Francfort, comédie en vaudevilles in 3 acts, with Emmanuel Théaulon
- 1828: La Fille de la veuve, comédie en vaudevilles in 2 acts, with Michel-Nicolas Balisson de Rougemont
- 1828: Lidda, ou la Servante, comédie en vaudevilles in 1 act, with Théaulon
- 1829: Le Bandit, plau in 2 act, mixed with songs, with Théaulon
- 1829: Jovial en prison, comédie en vaudevilles in 2 acts, with Gabriel de Lurieu and Théaulon
- 1829: Le Vieux marin, ou Une campagne imaginaire, vaudeville in 2 acts, with Jadin and Théaulon
- 1830: Journal de St-Cloud à Cherbourg, ou Récit de ce qui s'est passé à la suite du roi Charles X, du 26 juillet au 16 août 1830
- 1831: Mémoires, souvenirs et anecdotes sur l'intérieur du palais de Charles X et les événements de 1815 à 1830
- 1831: Le Noble et l'artisan, ou le Parent de tout le monde, comédie en vaudevilles in 2 acts, with René Perin
- 1831: Sophie et Mirabeau, ou 1773 et 1789, comédie en vaudevilles in 2 acts, with René Perin and Théaulon
- 1832: La prisonnière de Blaye
- 1832: La Baronne et le prince Catastrophe
- 1832: Edith Mac-Donald, histoire jacobite de 1715
- 1842: Le Guérillero, opera in 2 acts, with Ambroise Thomas
- 1844: Marie Stuart, opera in 5 acts, music by Louis Niedermeyer
- 1844: Analyse de Marie Stuart, opera in 5 acts
- 1851: M. le Comte de Chambord à Wiesbaden, souvenirs d'août 1850
- 1851: Quelques Pages du passé pour servir d'enseignement au présent et d'avertissement à l'avenir
- 1852: La chambre rouge, drama in 5 acts, with Auguste Maquet
- 1854: L'enfant du régiment, drama in 5 acts, with Auguste Maquet
- 1855–1856 Histoire de l'ordre militaire de Saint-Louis, depuis son institution en 1693 jusqu'en 1830, with Alexandre Mazas
- 1856: L'Espion du grand monde, drama in 5 acts, from the novel by Henri de Saint-Georges
- 1856: La Folle de Savenay
- 1856: La Reine de Paris, épisode du temps de la Fronde
- 1857: L'Homme au masque d'acier
- 1858: Le Chef des Invisibles
- 1859: Les Deux Marquis
- 1859: Le Cordonnier de la rue de la Lune
- 1860: Ivan IV (scènes choisies par l'Académie des beaux-arts pour servir de texte au concours de composition musicale de 1860), music by Émile Paladilhe
- 1862: Alain de Tinteniac
- 1863: Le Général Oudinot, duc de Reggio

== Bibliography ==
- Pierre Larousse, Grand dictionnaire universel du XIXe siècle, T.1, 1866, p. 402
- Louis Gustave Vapereau, Dictionnaire universel des contemporains, 1869, p. 49
- Silvio D'Amico, Enciclopedia dello spettacolo, vol.1, 1975, p. 653
- Guillaume de Bertier de Sauvigny, Alfred Fierro, Bibliographie critique des mémoires sur la Restauration, 1988, p. 11
- Spire Pitou, The Paris Opéra: an encyclopedia of operas, 1990, p. 41
- Olivier de Lagarde, Les noms de famille en Normandie, 1998, p. 25
