= Mathurin-Joseph Brisset =

French writer (1792–1856)

- Born: 22 November 1792; Dreux, France
- Died: 7 June 1856 (aged 63); Paris, France
- Occupations: Writer, poet, political journalist, playwright

Mathurin-Joseph Brisset (22 November 1792 – 7 June 1856) was a French writer, poet, political journalist and playwright of the first half of the 19th century.

== Biography ==
A bodyguard attached to the company of Havré, then an infantry officer during the reigns of Louis XVIII and Charles X, he took part to the Spanish campaign (1823) where he was awarded the cross of first class knight of the Order of Saint Ferdinand. He left the army after the July Revolution of 1830 and landed as political critic by the Gazette de France. He also held there theatrical criticism and devoted himself entirely to writing. Thus, he published a considerable number of historical novels and his plays were presented on the most famous Parisian stages of his time: Théâtre des Nouveautés, Théâtre du Vaudeville, Théâtre de la Porte-Saint-Martin, Gymnase dramatique etc.

== Works ==
- 1816: Les Dames du Lis, poem
- 1818: La Statue de Henri IV, ode
- 1818: La Salle des Maréchaux
- 1820: La Messe de délivrance
- 1820: Ernest
- 1821: Le Traité de paix, comédie-vaudeville in 1 act, with Achille d'Artois
- 1822: Le Départ d'une diligence, tableau épisodique in 1 act, mingled with vaudevilles, with Edmond Rochefort
- 1822: Honneur et séduction, melodrama in 3 acts, with Louis-Charles Caigniez
- 1822: Le Zodiaque de Paris, à propos du Zodiaque de Denderah, vaudeville-épisodique in 1 act, with Ferdinand Langlé
- 1823: Le Magasin de lumière, scènes à-propos de l'éclairage par le gaz, with Ferdinand Langlé, Ramond de la Croisette and Emmanuel Théaulon
- 1824: Le Retour à la ferme, comédie-vaudeville in 1 act, with Achille d'Artois
- 1825: Madrid, ou observations sur des mœurs et usages des Espagnols au commencement du XIXe siècle, with Théodore Anne
- 1825: Les Singes, ou la Parade dans le salon, vaudeville in 1 act, with Espérance Hippolyte Lassagne and Edmond Rochefort
- 1826: La pêche de Vulcain, ou L'île des fleuves, vaudeville, with Espérance Hippolyte Lassagne and Edmond Rochefort
- 1827: Le coureur de veuves, comedy in 2 acts
- 1827: Les Dernières amours, tableau-vaudeville in 1 act
- 1827: Les Rendez-vous, comédie-vaudeville
- 1827: Paris et Londres, Comedy in 4 tableaux, with Armand d'Artois
- 1828: Le Peintre et le courtisan, anecdotical comédie-vaudeville en 1 act
- 1828: L'Anneau de la fiancée, lyrical drama in 3 acts, with Felice Blangini
- 1829: Angiolina ou la Femme du doge, drama in 3 acts
- 1829: Les Deux Raymond, ou les Nouveaux Ménechmes, 6-chapter novel, with Victor Ducange
- 1835: Le Mauvais œil, tradition dalmate, suivi d'une nouvelle française
- 1837: Les Templiers, 1313
- 1838: Le Génie d'une femme
- 1840: François de Guise, 1563
- 1841: Le Balafré, 1572-1587
- 1843: Le cabinet de lecture
- 1844: Le Béarnais
- 1844: La Femme d'un ministre, Mme Roland. 1793
- 1845 Le Petit roi
- 1846: Madame Jean, 1846
- 1847: Les Concini, 1616-1617
- 1849: La Maréchale de Saint-André
- 1854: Jacquot
- 1854: M. de Beauregard
- 1854: La Maréchale de Saint-André
- 1859: Hugues-le-Cadavre, mystère du XIe siècle

== Bibliography ==
- Pierre Larousse, Grand dictionnaire universel du XIXe siècle, 1865, p. 1287
- Thomas Rossman Palfrey, L'Europe littéraire: (1833-1834), 1927, p. 147
- Charles Maillier, Trois journalistes drouais: Brisset, Dujarier, Buré, 1968, p. 19
- Robert Sabatier, Histoire de la poésie française: La poésie du XIXe siècle, 1975, p. 327
- Jed Z. Buchwald, Diane Greco Josefowicz, The Zodiac of Paris: How an Improbable Controversy Over an Ancient Egyptian, 2010, p. 254
