= Antoine Année =

French playwright and journalist (1770–1846)

Antoine Année (Avremesnil in pays de Caux, near Dieppe, 22 August 1770 – Paris, 27 March 1846) was an 18th/19th-century French playwright and journalist.

Année embraced early on the cause of freedom, but being in Paris at the times of the 20 June, the 10 August and the September Massacres, misfortunes and events made a deep impression on him, since he never ceased to rise against its excesses. During the reign of Terror, he was in the army, shelter and security asylum for men who did not occupy positions high enough to give rise to desire or arouse the fears of authority.

Some months after the Chute de Robespierre, Année returned to Paris and published under the title Réhabilitateur a magazine devoted to avenge the victims of the Terror. It was still too near the system against which he stood and his newspaper only numbered some twenty issues. The men who had played leading roles were still too powerful for such paper to be published with impunity and Année was forced to abandon it.

He previously co-wrote some vaudevilles and contributed literary articles to several periodicals, including the Revue encyclopédique, the Mercure du XIXe siècle and Le Constitutionnel. At a time when the critic Julien Louis Geoffroy threw consternation behind the scenes, Année gathered his various judgments, opposed them to each other and wrote a book that was assigned to Pigault-Lebrun.

== Theatre ==
- Arlequin-décorateur, comédie-parade in 1 act and in prose, mingled with vaudevilles, with Nicolas Gersin and Alexandre de Ferrière, Paris, Théâtre du Vaudeville, 24 August 1798 Text online
- Le Carrosse espagnol, ou Pourquoi faire ? comédie-vaudeville in 1 act and in prose, with Nicolas Gersin and Étienne de Jouy, Paris, Vaudeville, 4 January 1800
- Gilles ventriloque, parade mingled with vaudevilles, in 1 act, with Nicolas Gersin and Pierre-Ange Vieillard, Paris, Vaudeville, 5 March 1800 Text online
- Une nuit d'été, ou Un peu d'aide fait grand bien, opéra comique in 3 acts, with Nicolas Gersin, music by Arthur Pougin, Paris, Opéra-Comique, 7 June 1800
- Le Premier Homme du monde, ou la Création du sommeil, folie-vaudeville in 1 act, with Pierre-Ange Vieillard, Paris, Opéra-Comique, 30 December 1800
- Un tour de soubrette, comedy in 1 act and in prose, avec Nicolas Gersin, Paris, Théâtre Louvois, 21 February 1805
- Les Travestissements, comedy in 1 act and in prose, avec Nicolas Gersin et Pierre-Ange Vieillard, Paris, Louvois, 7 August 1805
- Une heure de caprice, comedy in 1 act, mingled with vaudevilles, with Nicolas Gersin, Paris, Vaudeville, 1 Octobre 1805

== Sources ==
- Antoine-Vincent Arnault, Antoine Jay, Étienne de Jouy, Biographie nouvelle des contemporains, t. 1er, Librairie historique, Paris, p. 191-2.
