= Alexandre Barrière =

Alexis Barrière
- Born: Daniel Alexis François Barrière; 22 October 1792; Paris, France
- Died: 30 August 1865; Paris

Daniel Alexis François Barrière, also called Barrière aîné, (22 October 1792 – 30 August 1865) was a 19th-century French playwright, engraver and song writer.

== Biography ==
An engraver, trained by his father, he drew a part of the campaign plans for the marshal Laurent de Gouvion-Saint-Cyr as well as maps of Swabia, Russia, Corsica or Spain and of the county Mayo. He also made prints for the library.

His plays were presented on the most famous Parisian stages of the 19th century: Théâtre du Vaudeville, Théâtre des Variétés, Théâtre de l'Ambigu-Comique, etc.

His songs were published in 1829 in the book Étrennes lyriques ou Recueil de romances et nocturnes, with piano or harpes accompagnements by Antoine Romagnesi.

== Plays and songs ==
- 1813: Le Mari en vacances, comédie-vaudeville in 1 act, with Marc-Antoine Désaugiers
- 1816: Trois pour une ou les absents n'ont pas toujours tort, comédie-vaudeville en 1 act, with Désaugiers
- 1817: La Vendange normande, ou les Deux voisins, vaudeville in 1 act, with Michel-Joseph Gentil de Chavagnac
- 1830: Notre Grand'mère, chansonnette
- 1835: Mon bonnet de nuit, comédie-vaudeville in 1 act, with Georges Duval
- 1835: Oui et non, comédie-vaudeville in 2 acts
- 1837: Les savetiers francs-juges, chronique messinaise in 3 acts, mingled with songs
- 1840: Les Pages de Louis XII, comedy mingled with song, in 2 acts, with Ferdinand de Villeneuve
- 1842: Le poète, ou Les droits de l'auteur, comedy in 1 act and in verses
- 1848: L'Autel de la Patrie, hymne national, music by Félix Marie
- 1857: Le legs (The Legacy), comedy by Marivaux set in verses
- 1861: La Sainte-Catherine, ou Un bienfait n'est jamais perdu, à-propos-vaudeville in 1 act

== Bibliography ==
- Joseph-marie Quérard, La littérature française contemporaine, vol.3, 1827-1844, p. 164
- Charles Gabet, Dictionnaire des artistes de l'école française au XIXe, 1831, p. 29
- Edwin Colby Byam, Théodore Barrière, dramatist of the second empire, 1938, p. 14
