= W. Lafontaine =

French playwright (1796-1859)

W. Lafontaine (10 July 1796 in Moscow – 1859 in the 10th arrondissement of Paris) was a 19th-century French playwright.

== Biography ==
This was probably the pseudonym of Jean Baptiste Joseph Lafontaine who made himself called "Wanincka" (short for Jean in Russian).

Born in the Russian Empire, he came to France in 1802 or 1803 with his father and two brothers. He served in the Imperial Guard from 1812 to 1815 and then as a rifleman until 1817.

After he returned to civilian life, he lived in Paris at 9 Rue du Helder when he married Antoinette Marie Laurentine Almaïde Arnoult de Sartrouville on 18 November 1820. On the marriage certificate, his profession is "man of letters". He then made himself called Wanincka de La Fontaine: he is thus designated on the death certificate of his wife Antoinette, and again on the marriage certificate of his brother Joseph-Pierre at Chamboeuf in 1820 as well as in the birth certificate of his first son Joseph Paul in 1821.

He later became commissaire de police in Paris and lived at 7 rue des Carmelites. Whereas he thought he was exempted to apply for naturalization (since he was married to a French woman and father of five children born in France, and having lived thirty years in France), he must apply to be naturalized French on 28 December 1835 because, at the time, if born abroad, even from French parents, people had to be naturalized to have French nationality and be employed at the service of the State.

His plays were given on the most important Parisian stages of the 19th century, including the Théâtre des Variétés, Théâtre de la Gaîté, and the Théâtre du Vaudeville.

He is buried in Neuilly sur Seine.

== Works ==
- 1819: Le Mariage à la husarde, ou Une nuit de printemps, comedy in 1 act and in prose, mingled with vaudevilles, with Armand d'Artois and Emmanuel Théaulon
- 1819: M. Furet, ou l'Homme aux secrets, comedy in 1 act and in prose, mingled with couplets, with Nicolas Brazier, Pierre Carmouche and Armand-François Jouslin de La Salle
- 1819: Les Plaideurs de Racine, comédie-anecdote in 1 act and in prose, with Brazier
- 1821: L'Auberge du grand Frédéric, comédie en vaudeville in 1 act, with Théaulon
- 1821: Les Voleurs supposés, comédie en vaudeville in 1 act, with Mélesville and Gabriel-Alexandre Belle
- 1822: La Chercheuse d'esprit, comédie en vaudeville by Favart, given to theatre with changes, with Théophile Marion Dumersan
- 1823: Les Dames Martin, ou le Mari, la femme et la veuve, comédie en vaudeville in 1 act, with Henri de Tully
- 1823: Les Femmes et le secret, one-act comedy, mingled with couplets, with Gaspard Touret
- 1823: Mon ami Christophe, one-act comédie en vaudeville, with Charles Dupeuty and Ferdinand de Villeneuve
- 1823: Trilby, ou le Lutin du foyer, one-act comedy, mingled with couplets, with Théaulon and Jouslin de La Salle
- 1824: La Jeunesse d'un grand peintre, ou les Artistes à Rome, comedy in 1 act and in prose, mingled with couplets, with Jules Vernet
- 1825: Le Docteur du défunt, one-act comédie en vaudeville, with Pierre Carmouche and Léon Laya
- 1825: La Dot et la fille, ou le Commis marchand, one-act comedy, mingled with couplet, with Louis Gabriel Montigny
- 1825: Le Marchand de parapluies, ou la Noce à la guinguette, comédie grivoise in 1 act, mingled with couplets, with Marc-Antoine Désaugiers
- 1827: Les Compagnons du devoir, ou le Tour de France, one-act tableau-vaudeville, with Étienne Crétu and Louis-Émile Vanderburch
- 1827: Joseph II ou l'inconnu au cabaret, comédie en vaudeville, with Félix-Auguste Duvert and Alexandre-Joseph Le Roy de Bacre
- 1828: M. Rossignol, ou le Prétendu de province, one-act folie-vaudeville, with Duvert and de Tully
- 1829: Mon oncle le bossu, ou les Deux pupilles, one-act comedy, in prose, with Mélesville and Eugène de Gaville

== Bibliography ==
- Henry Lyonnet, Dictionnaire des comédiens français, 1911, (p. 408)
- Joseph-Marie Quérard, Lafontaine W., in La France littéraire ou dictionnaire bibliographique des savants..., 1930, (p. 418)
