= Achille d'Artois =

French writer (1791–1868)

- Born: Louis Charles Achille d'Artois de Bournonville; 17 March 1791; Noyon, France
- Died: 2 December 1868 (aged 77); Versailles, France
- Occupations: Writer, libretist and dramatist.

Louis Charles Achille d'Artois de Bournonville (17 March 1791 – 2 December 1868) was a French writer, librettist and dramatist. His plays were performed on many Parisian stages during his lifetime, including Théâtre des Variétés, Théâtre du Vaudeville, Théâtre de la Gaîté, Opéra-Comique, Odéon, and Théâtre de la Renaissance.

== Works ==
- Les maris ont tort, comédie en vaudevilles in 1 act, 1813
- Pauché ou la curiosité des femmes, comédie anachréontique, in 1 act, mingled with vaudevilles, with Théaulon, 1814
- Le Roi et la Ligue, opéra comique in 2 acts, with Théaulon, 1815
- Turenne, ou Un trait de modestie, with F. de Bury, 1815
- Les visites, tableau vaudeville in 1 act, with Armand d'Artois and Théaulon, 1815
- La Rosière de Hartwell, comedie en vaudevilles on one act, with Armand d'Artois, 1816
- Les perroquets de la mère Philippe, with Armand d'Artois and Emmanuel Théaulon, 1818
- La Saint-Henri, divertissement, with Théodore Anne, 1825
- Le Pâte d'anguille, ou le quiproquo, vaudeville in 1 act, after La Fontaine, 1828
- Les troqueurs, 1819
- Angéline ou la champenoise, comédie in vaudevilles imitated from German, with Emmanuel Théaulon, 1819
- L'Invisible, ou la Curiosité d'une veuve, comédie en vaudevilles in 1 act, with Fulgence de Bury, 1820
- Le Traité de paix, comédie en vaudeville in 1 act, with Brisset, 1821
- Le Coq de village, with Charles-Simon Favart, 1822
- Les Frères rivaux, ou la Prise de tabac, comédie en vaudevilles in 1 act, 1822
- Guillaume, Gautier et Garguille, ou Le Cœur et la pensée, comédie grivoise in 1 act, mingled with couplets, with Gabriel de Lurieu, 1822
- Le père et le tuteur, 5-act comedy, 1822
- La Pauvre Fille, 1-act vaudeville, with Armand d'Artois (1788–1867) and Michel Dieulafoy, 1823
- Le polichinelle sans le savoir, comédie-parade mingled with ariettes, with Armand-François Jouslin de La Salle, 1823
- Les Amours de village, vaudeville in 1 act, 1823
- La Dame des Belles Cousines, vaudeville in 1 act, 1823
- Le Duc d'Aquitaine ou Le Retour, with Emmanuel Théaulon and Felice Blangini, 1823
- Les Femmes volantes, vaudeville-féerie in 2 acts, with E. Théaulon, 1824
- Alfred, ou la Bonne Tête !, vaudeville in 1 act, with Théodore Anne, 1824
- La Curieuse, comédie en vaudevilles in 2 acts, 1824
- Les Deux officiers, vaudeville in 1 act, with Théodore Anne, 1824
- Le Mariage de convenance, comédie en vaudevilles in 2 acts, with Théaulon, 1824
- L'Officier et le paysan, opéra comique in 1 act in prose, with Charles-Frédéric Kreubé, 1824
- Le Retour à la ferme, comédie en vaudevilles in 1 act, with Mathurin-Joseph Brisset, 1824
- La Sorcière des Vosges, vaudeville in 2 acts, 1824
- Belphégor, ou le Bonnet du diable, vaudeville-féerie in 1 act, with Jules-Henri Vernoy de Saint-Georges and Jules Vernet, 1825
- Le Champenois, ou les Mystifications, comédie en vaudevilles in 1 act, 1825
- Les Châtelaines, ou les Nouvelles Amazones, vaudeville in 1 act, with Théodore Anne, 1825
- L'Exilé, vaudeville en 2 actes, with Théodore Anne and Henri de Tully, after Walter Scott, 1825
- La Grand'Maman, ou le Lendemain de noces, comédie en vaudevilles in 1 act, 1825
- Le Bon père, comedy in 1 act, with Ferdinand Laloue, 1827
- Le Caleb, comedy in one acte, with Eugène de Planard, after Walter Scott, 1827
- Les Forgerons, comédie en vaudevilles in 2 acts, 1827
- Le Futur de la grand'maman, with Monnais, 1827
- L'Homme de Paille, comedy in 1 act, mingled with vaudevilles, 1827
- Le Jeu de cache-cache, ou la Fiancée, comedy in 2 acts, 1827
- Les Jolis soldats, with Théaulon, 1827
- Le Mariage à la hussarde, ou une nuit de printemps, one-act comedy, with Emmanuel Théaulon, 1827
- Le Matin et le soir, ou la Fiancée et la mariée, comedy in 2 acts, with Eugène de Lamerlière and Emmanuel Théaulon, 1828
- Le Château de Monsieur le Baron, comédie en vaudevilles in 2 acts, with Adolphe de Leuven, 1828
- Le Brutal, Henri III episode in 2 tableaux, 1829
- Les Suites d'un mariage de raison, drama in 1 act, with Léon Lévy Brunswick and Victor Lhérie, 1829
- La veille et le lendemain ou Il faut bien aimer son mari, comédie en vaudevilles in 2 acts, with Armand d'Artois, 1829
- La Czarine, with Michel Masson, 1830
- L'espionne, with Dupeuty, 1830
- La Lingère du Marais, ou la Nouvelle Manon Lescaut, vaudeville in 3 acts, with Henri Dupin, 1830
- M. Cagnard ou les Conspirateurs, folie du jour in one act, with Nicolas Brazier and Théophile Marion Dumersan, 1831
- L'Ange gardien, ou Sœur Marie, comedy in 2 acts, with Henri Dupin, 1831
- Batardi, ou Le désagrément de n'avoir ni mère, ni père, with Dupin, 1831
- Le Boa, ou le Bossu à la mode, comédie en vaudevilles in 1 act, with Francis Cornu, 1831
- La prima donna ou La sœur de lait, 1832
- Le Fils du Savetier, ou les Amours de Télémaque, vaudeville in one act, with Jules Chabot de Bouin, 1832
- L'aiguillette bleue, historical vaudeville in three acts, with Ernest Jaime and Michel Masson, 1834
- La Chambre de Rossini, canevas à l'italienne, mingled with vaudevilles and new music, with Jean-Toussaint Merle and Antoine Simonnin, 1834
- La jolie voyageuse ou Les deux Giroux, with René de Chazet and Joseph-Bernard Rosier, 1834
- Jean Jean don Juan, parodie en cinq pièces, with Michel-Nicolas Balisson de Rougemont and Charles Dupeuty, 1835
- Un mois de fidélité, with Charles-François-Jean-Baptiste Moreau de Commagny, 1835
- Le Comédien de salon, with Edmond Rochefort, 1836
- Le Jeune père, with Jules-Henri Vernoy de Saint-Georges, 1836
- Scipion, ou le Beau-père, comédie en vaudevilles in 3 acts, with E. Rochefort, 1836
- Trois cœurs de femmes, vaudeville in 3 acts, with Adolphe d'Ennery and Edmond Burat de Gurgy, 1836
- Un frère de quinze ans, comédie en vaudevilles in 1 act, with Alexis Decomberousse, 1838
- Valentine, comédie en vaudeville in 2 acts, with Armand d'Artois, 1839
- Vingt-six ans, comedy in 2 acts, with Armand d'Artois, 1839
- Un jeune caissier, drama in 3 acts, with Théaulon, 1840
- Lucrèce Borgia, opera in 3 acts, with Henri de Saint-Georges, 1840
- Une Idée de médecin, comédie en 1 acte mêlée de couplets, with Armand d'Artois, 1844
- La Gardeuse de dindons, comédie en vaudevilles in 3 acts, with Edmond de Biéville and Emmanuel Théaulon, 1845
- Un domestique pour tout faire, comédie en vaudevilles in 1 act, 1846
- La Fille obéissante, comédie en vaudevilles in 1 act, 1847
- Un Monsieur qui veut exister, vaudeville in 1 act, with Armand d'Artois, 1849
- Un Dieu du jour, comédie en vaudevilles in 2 actes, with Roger de Beauvoir, 1850
- Un bon ouvrier, comédie en vaudevilles, with Joseph-Bernard Rosier, 1852
- Jusqu'à minuit, comédie en vaudevilles in 1 act, 1852
- Le Château de Coetaven, comedy mingled with songs in 1 act, with Galoppe d'Onquaire, 1852
- Reculer pour mieux sauter, proverbe-vaudeville in 1 act, with Armand d'Artois, 1854

== Bibliography ==
- Gustave Vapereau, Dictionnaire universel des contemporains, 1870
- T. J. Walsh, Second Empire opera: the Théâtre lyrique, Paris 1851-1870, 1981, (p. 341)
- Olivier Bara, Le théâtre de l'opéra-comique sous la restauration, 2001, (p. 116)
- Hector Berlioz, Critique musicale 1823-1863, 2004, (p. 549)
