= Espérance Hippolyte Lassagne =

French chansonnier and playwright (d. 1854)

Espérance Hippolyte Lassagne (c. 1786 – 1854) was a French chansonnier and playwright during the first half of the 19th century.

== Biography ==
An employee at the Palais-Royal (1823) in the administration of the Duke of Orleans (Louis Philippe I) in Paris, he had under him Alexandre Dumas then hired as a copyist, whom he introduced into the literary life. He wrote with him the play La Noce et l'Enterrement which would be presented at the Théâtre de la Porte-Saint-Martin in 1826.

His plays were presented on the most significant Parisian stages of his fifetime: Théâtre du Vaudeville, Théâtre de l'Odéon, Théâtre des Variétés etc.

== Works ==
- 1824: La Pièce de circonstance, ou le Théâtre dans la caserne, à-propos-vaudeville
- 1824: La Rue du Carrousel, ou le Musée en boutique, vaudeville in 1 act, with Théodore Anne
- 1825: Dansera-t-on ? ou les Deux adjoints, à-propos vaudeville in 1 act, with Paul Ledoux
- 1825: Les Singes, ou la Parade dans le salon, vaudeville in 1 act, with Rochefort and Brisset
- 1826: La pêche de Vulcain, ou L'île des fleuves, à-propos mingled with vaudeville, with Mathurin-Joseph Brisset and Edmond Rochefort
- 1826: Le Prologue impromptu, ou les Acteurs en retard, à propos in 1 act and in vaudevilles, with Marc-Antoine Désaugiers
- 1826: La Noce et l'Enterrement, play, with Alexandre Dumas and Gustave Vulpian
- 1828: Le Farceur de société, ou les Suites d'une parade, play in 2 acts, mingled with couplets, with Rochefort
- 1828: Les Omnibus, ou la Revue en voiture, vaudeville en 4 tableaux, with Frédéric de Courcy and Charles Dupeuty
- 1828: Le Restaurant, ou le Quart d'heure de Rabelais, tableau-vaudeville in 1 act, with de Courcy
- undated; Le Retour du guernadier, song
