= Alexandre de Ferrière =

French publisher and writer (1771–1848)

Alexandre Leblanc de Ferrière (18 October 1771, Bar-sur-Seine – 23 February 1848) was an 18th–19th-century French playwright, journalist, printer, publisher and writer.

== Biography ==
The printer and director of L'Arlequin, journal de pièces et de morceaux (1799), a journalist by the daily Le Monde (1796-1798), the head of the statistical bureau of the Interior ministry (1803), responsible for the Annales de statistique française et étrangère (1803-1804) and the Archives statistiques de la France (1804-1805), an editor for the Analyse de la statistique générale de la France published by the French Interior ministry (1803-1804), he wrote an Annuaire de Paris et des environs, published in 1838. His theatre plays were presented on the most important Parisian stages of the 18th and 19th centuries, including the Théâtre de l'Ambigu, the Théâtre de la Gaîté, the Théâtre Le Temple, and the Théâtre du Vaudeville.

== Works ==
- 1776: Les Souliers mordorés ou la Cordonnière allemande, opéra comique in 2 acts
- 1797: Arlequin-décorateur, comédie-parade in 1 act and in prose, mingled with vaudevilles, with Nicolas Gersin and Antoine Année
- 1803 – 1804: Analyse de la statistique générale de la France
- 1805: Holkar et Palamys, ou Les Anglais dans l'Indoustan
- 1806: Un voyage à Versailles, 2 vols.
- 1806: Ester, with Philippe-Aristide-Louis-Pierre Plancher de Valcour
- 1807: Un Conte des mille et une nuits, opéra comique in 1 act, music by Charles-Henri Plantade
- 1810: Grotius, ou le Fort de Loevesteen
- 1811: Charlemagne, ou les Grands jours de l'Empire français
- 1811: Favart à Bruxelles, comédie-vaudeville in 1 act
- 1812: Amour et loyauté, ou le Mariage militaire, comedy in 1 act, mingled with couplets, with Richard Fabert
- 1812: Arlequin-Lucifer, ou Cassandre alchimiste, folie in 1 act mingled with couplets, with Fabert
- 1813: Archambaud ou Amour et devoir, melodrama in 3 acts
- 1813: La Coutume écossaise ou Le Mariage sur la frontière, comédie-vaudeville in 1 act, with Charles Rondeau
- 1814: Les Trois talismans, melodrama in 3 acts and extravaganza
- 1816: Éléonore de Lusignan, melodrama in 3 acts, with Jean Edme Paccard
- 1816: Marguerite de Strafford, ou le Retour à la royauté, melodrama in 3 acts, in prose and extravaganza, with Desprez
- 1816: Le Mariage sous d'heureux auspices, vaudeville in 1 act, with Desprez
- 1816: Opinion sur le divorce considéré sous le rapport de la religion et des mœurs
- 1817: Inès, ou les Devoirs d'un roi, melodrama in 3 acts and extravaganza
- 1817: Hassem, ou la vengeance, melodrama in 3 acts
- 1818: Les Deux ambitions
- 1818: L'Incendie du village, ou les Représailles militaires, melodrama in 3 acts, extravaganza, with Jean-Baptiste Dubois
- 1819: Grégoire à Tunis, ou les Bons effets du vin, vaudeville in 1 act, with Aimé Desprez
- 1822: L'Actrice en voyage, vaudeville in 1 act, with Carron de Morcourt and Gaspard Tourret
- 1822: Les Deux baillis, ou le Mariage par procuration, comedy in 1 act, in prose
- 1825: La Fille du musicien, drama in 3 acts, with Edmond Crosnier
- 1825: La Comtesse de Tarascon, ou Dix années d'absence, anecdote du XIIIe siècle
- 1831: L'Hôtel des princes, opéra comique in 1 act, music by Eugène Prévost
- 1834: Jane Gray, drama in 3 acts and 5 tableaux, music by François Bellon, preceded with 6 juillet 1553, prologue in 1 act
- 1837: Annuaire de Paris et de ses environs dans un rayon de dix lieues
- 1838: Les Étouffeurs, drama in 2 acts, with Charles Foliguet
- 1838: Paris et ses environs, description historique, statistique et monumentale
- 1842: Lequel ?, comédie-vaudeville in 1 act, with Louis Berthier and Pierre Tournemine
- 1845: Introduction à l'étude philosophique de la phrénologie

== Bibliography ==
- Joseph Marie Quérard, La France littéraire, ou Dictionnaire bibliographique des savants, 1829, (p. 114)
- Jean-Dominique Mellot et Élisabeth Queval, avec la collaboration d'Antoine Monaque, Répertoire d'imprimeurs-libraires (c. 1500 – c. 1810), Service de l'Inventaire rétrospectif des fonds imprimés de la Bibliothèque nationale de France, 2004.
