= Charles Rondeau =

Charles Rondeau may refer to:

- Charles Rondeau (playwright), 19th-century French playwright
- Charles R. Rondeau (1917–1996), American television director
