= Nicolas Gersin =

French playwright and librettist (1765–1833)

Nicolas Gersin (born 1765 – died December 1833 at Chantilly) was a French playwright and librettist.

An uncle of Jean-Louis-Auguste Loiseleur-Deslongchamps who studied in his home, his plays have been performed on the most important Parisian stages of the 19th century: Théâtre du Vaudeville, Théâtre de l'Odéon, Théâtre des Variétés-Amusantes, Théâtre-Français etc.

He died of apoplexy in December 1833 at Chantilly.

== Works ==
- Rosine ou l’Épouse abandonnée, opera in 3 acts, music by François-Joseph Gossec, 1786
- Hymne à l’Être suprême, 1794
- Arlequin-décorateur, comédie-parade in 1 act and in prose, mêlée de vaudevilles, with Alexandre de Ferrière, 1798
- Ne pas croire ce qu'on voit, comédie en vaudevilles in 1 act, 1798
- Gilles ventriloque, with Pierre-Ange Vieillard, 1799
- Le Triomphe de Camille, opéra in 1 act, with Vieillard, 1799
- Le Carrosse espagnol ou Pourquoi faire ?, comédie en vaudevilles in 1 act, with Étienne de Jouy, 1799
- Papirius ou Les Femmes comme elles étaient, parade historique in 1 act, mêlée de Vaudevilles, with Pierre-Ange Vieillard, 1801
- Les travestissements, comedy en 1 act, with Vieillard, 1805
- Un Tour de soubrette, comedy in 1 act and in prose, 1805
- Une heure de caprice, comedy in 1 act, mingled with vaudevilles, 1805
- Les Valets de campagne, comedy in 1 act, mingled with vaudevilles, 1805
- Les quatre Henri ou Le jugement du meunier de Lieursaint, parody without parody in 1 act mingled with vaudevilles, with Henri Simon, 1806
- Les filles de Mémoire ou Le mnémonite, comedy in 1 act, mingled with vaudevilles, with Michel Dieulafoy, 1807
- Le fond du sac ou La préface de Lina, parody vaudeville, in 1 act, with Dieulafoy, 1807
- Les pages du Duc de Vendôme, comedy in 1 act, mingled with vaudevilles, with Dieulafoy, 1807
- Au feu ou Les femmes solitaires, comédie en vaudevilles, in 1 act, with Dieulafoy, 1808
- La vallée de Barcelonnette ou Le Rendez-vous des deux ermites, comedy en vaudevilles in 1 act, with Dieulafoy, 1808
- Bayard au Pont-Neuf, ou le Picotin d'avoine, folie-vaudeville in 1 act, with Dieulafoy, 1808
- L'intrigue impromptue ou Il n'y a plus d'enfant, comédie en vaudevilles in 1 act, with Dieulafoy, 1809
- Adam Montauciel ou A qui la gloire ?, à-propos in 1 act and in vaudevilles, with Michel-Nicolas Balisson de Rougemont and Marc-Antoine Désaugiers, 1809
- L'auberge dans les nues ou le Chemin de la gloire, petite revue de quelques grandes pièces, in 1 act and in vaudevilles, with Dieulafoy and Henri Simon, 1810
- La manufacture d'indiennes ou Le triomphe du Schall et des queues du chat (parodie des bayadères), vaudeville in 1 act, with Dieulafoy, 1810
- La Robe et les bottes, ou Un effet d'optique, folie-vaudeville in 1 act, with Dieulafoy, 1810
- La Revanche grecque, ou Mahomet jugé par les femmes, tragicomico-vaudeville in 1 act, with Dieulafoy, 1811
- La Tasse de chocolat, ou Trop parler nuit, comédie en vaudevilles in 1 act, with Dieulafoy, 1811
- Jeanne d'Arc, ou le siège d'Orléans, historical comedy in 3 acts, mêlée de vaudevilles, with Dieulafoy, 1812
- Les Gardes-marine ou L'Amour et la faim, vaudeville in 1 act, with Dieulafoy, 1816
- Sans-Gêne chez lui, ou Chacun son tour, vaudeville in 1 act, with Dieulafoy, 1816
- Une visite à Charenton, folie-vaudeville in 1 act, with Pierre Carmouche, Eugène Durieu and Henri Simon, 1818
- Le Duel par la croisée, ou le Français à Milan, comédie en vaudevilles in 1 act, with Dieulafoy, 1818
- Brouette à vendre, comedy in 1 act, mêlée de vaudevilles, with Dieulafoy, 1818
- La Promesse de mariage, ou le Retour au hameau, opéra comique en 1 act and in prose, with Dieulafoy, 1818
- Le Drapeau français, ou les Soldats de Louis XIV, historical fact in 1 act, mingled with vaudevilles, with Henri Simon, 1819
- Un Dîner à Pantin, ou l'Amphytrion à la diète, tableau-vaudeville in 1 act, with Marc-Antoine Désaugiers and Michel-Joseph Gentil de Chavagnac, 1820
- La Leçon de danse et d'équitation, comedy in 1 act, mingled with couplets, with Sewrin, 1821
- Le Permesse gelé, ou les Glisseurs littéraires, folie-revue in 1 act, with Théaulon and Armand d'Artois, 1821
- La chercheuse d'esprit, opéra comique by Favart, mis en vaudevilles, with de Lurieu, 1822
- Les Arrangeuses, ou les Pièces mises en pièces, folie-vaudeville, in 1 act, with de Lurieu and Édouard-Joseph-Ennemond Mazères, 1822
- Le Chevalier d'honneur, comedy in 1 act, mingled with vaudevilles, with Sewrin and Léonard Tousez, 1823
- L'aveugle de Montmorency, comedy in 1 act mingled with couplets, with Nicolas Brazier, and Gabriel de Lurieu, 1823
- La Route de Bordeaux, à-propos in 1 act and in free verses, with Marc-Antoine Désaugiers and Michel-Joseph Gentil de Chavagnac, 1823
- La Couronne de fleurs, vaudeville in 1 act, with Gabriel de Lurieu et Jean-Baptiste-Charles Vial, 1825
- Le Château et la ferme, comedy in 1 act and in prose, with Emmanuel Théaulon et Paul Duport, 1825
- L'Appartement garni, ou les Deux locataires, comédie en vaudevilles in 1 act, with Pierre-Frédéric-Adolphe Carmouche and Mélesville, 1826
- Les Dames à la mode, à-propos-vaudeville in 1 act, with Brazier and de Lurieu, 1826
- Le Voisin, ou Faisons nos affaires nous-mêmes, comédie en vaudevilles in 1 act, with de Lurieu and Marc-Antoine Désaugiers, 1826

== Bibliography ==
- Pierre Marie Michel Lepeintre Desroches, Fin du Répertoire du Théâtre Français, 1824, p. 20
- Paul Ackermann, Dictionnaire biographique universel et pittoresque, vol.3, 1834, p. 18
- Mathieu Richard Auguste Henrion, Annuaire biographique, 1834, p. 417
