= Alphonse Salin =

French playwright and chansonnier (1798–1878)

- Born: Nicolas Alphonse Salin; 5 July 1798; Montargis, France
- Died: 6 June 1878 (aged 79); Vincennes, France
- Occupations: Playwright, chansonnier

Nicolas Alphonse Salin (5 July 1798 – 6 June 1878) was a French playwright and chansonnier.

== Biography ==
An employee at the Chancellery until 1830 and then at the Hôtel des Monnaies, Paris, where he became chief controller for coinage (1857), his plays were presented on the most important Parisian stages of the 19th century: Théâtre de la Porte Saint-Antoine, Théâtre de la Porte-Saint-Martin etc.

His songs were published in Le Caveau. He was made a knight of the Legion of Honour on 13 August 1861

== Works ==
- 1823: L'Espagne délivrée, cantata
- 1836: L'Amour et l'homéopathie, vaudeville in 2 acts, with Adolphe Jadin and Henri de Tully
- 1839: Un cœur de 30,000 livres de rente, vaudeville n 1 act
- 1839: Une Matinée aux Prés Saint-Gervais, vaudeville en un acte, with Alfred Bouet
- 1839: Une nièce d'Amérique, vaudeville en 1 act
- 1839: Le Salon dans la mansarde, vaudeville in 1 act
- 1840: Dodore en pénitence, soliloquy-vaudeville in 1 act
- 1841: Les Mousquetaires, dramea vaudeville in 2 acts
- 1841: La Nièce du pasteur, comédie en vaudevilles in 2 acts
- 1841: L'Ange de la bienfaisance, song
- 1860: Santé portée à M. Richard Bérenger, commandant le 18e bataillon de la Garde nationale, song
- 1860: Les Reines du jour, song (Lire le texte sur Wikisource)
- 1866: Les Bottes neuves, song
- undated: L'épouvantail, comédie en vaudevilles in 1 act, with Narcisse Fournier
- 1889: Mademoiselle !, chanson, music by Frédéric Boissière, posth.

== Bibliography ==
- Louis Gustave Vapereau, Dictionnaire universel des contemporains, 1861, (p. 1556)
