= Fulgence de Bury =

French playwright (1785-1845)

- Born: Joseph Désiré Fulgence de Bury; 1 March 1785; Paris
- Died: 23 June 1845 (aged 60); Paris
- Occupation: Playwright

Fulgence de Bury, real name: Joseph Désiré Fulgence de Bury (1 March 1785 – 23 June 1845) was a 19th-century French playwright.

A civil servant in the administration, he became known under the pen name Fulgence. His theatre plays were presented on the most important Parisian stages including the Théâtre du Palais-Royal, the Opéra-Comique, the Théâtre de l'Odéon, the Théâtre du Gymnase, and the Théâtre des Variétés.

== Works ==
- 1815: Turenne, ou Un trait de modestie, historical comédie en vaudeville in 1 act, with Achille d'Artois
- 1816: La Bataille de Denain, opéra comique in 3 acts, with Armand d'Artois and Emmanuel Théaulon
- 1819: Un moment d'imprudence, comedy in 3 acts
- 1819: Le Moulin de Bayard, historical vaudeville in 1 act, with Marc-Michel and Charles Nombret Saint-Laurent
- 1820: L'Autre Henri, ou l'An 1880, comedy in 3 acts, in prose, with Théaulon and Pierre Capelle
- 1820: L'Invisible, ou la Curiosité d'une veuve, comédie en vaudevilles in 1 act, with Achille d'Artois
- 1821: Le Baptême de village, ou le Parrain de circonstance, vaudeville in 1 act, with Marc-Antoine Désaugiers, Michel-Joseph Gentil de Chavagnac, Paul Ledoux and Ramond de la Croisette
- 1821: Un Jeu de Bourse, ou la Bascule, comedy in 1 act
- 1821: Les deux ménages, comedy in three acts, with Louis-Benoît Picard and Alexis Jacques Marie Vafflard
- 1822: Une visite aux Invalides, à-propos mingled with couplets, with Michel-Joseph Gentil de Chavagnac and Paul Ledoux
- 1823: Le comte d'Angoulême, ou Le siège de Gênes, with Michel-Joseph Gentil de Chavagnac, Paul Ledoux and Ramond de la Croisette
- 1824: Le célibataire et l'homme marié, comedy in three acts and in prose, with Alexis Jacques Marie Vafflard
- 1824: Grétry, opéra comique in 1 act, with Paul Ledoux and Ramond de la Croisette
- 1824: Le Voyage à Dieppe, with Alexis Jacques M. Wafflard, comedy in 3 acts
- 1825: Le Béarnais, ou la Jeunesse de Henri IV, comedy in 1 act and in free verses, with Paul Ledoux, Ramond de la Croisette
- 1827: Le Mari par intérim, comédie en vaudevilles in 1 act, with Charles Nombret Saint-Laurent and Henri de Tully
- 1829: L'humoriste, vaudeville in 1 act, with Charles Dupeuty and Henri de Tully
- 1833: Louis XI en goguettes, vaudeville in 1 act, with Alexis Decomberousse
- 1840: Une journée chez Mazarin, comedy in 1 act, mingled with couplets, with Alexis Decomberousse and Théodore Muret

== Bibliography ==
- Théophile Astrie, Les cimetières de Paris, 1865, p. 158
