= Marie Dorval =

French actress (1798–1849)

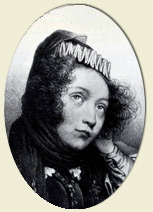
Marie Dorval

Marie Dorval (6 January 1798, Lorient, Morbihan – 20 May 1849) was a French actress in the Romantic style.

== Early life and first marriage ==
Marie Thomase Amélie Delauney was born on 6 January 1798 to Marie Bourdais, who was sixteen years old. Her father, Joseph-Charles Delaunay was an actor who happened upon a traveling acting company where he met Marie Boudais, the daughter of the troupe manager. He abandoned his daughter and died of yellow fever on 15 July 1802. Dorval's mother died on 18 February 1818. Dorval met Alain Dorval when she was fifteen years old, and he was thirty-six. The two were married in Vannes on 12 February 1814.

Marie and her mother travelled parts of Brittany and France during the period from 1806 to 1810. By 1813, they joined the itinerant acting troupes run by Johann Ross in Paris, where the young Marie met Alain Dorval and married him in 1814. They had two children together, Marie-Louise-Désirée in 1814 and Catherine-Françoise-Sophie-Gabrielle in 1815. Dorval eventually left Marie and the children, and died a few years later in St. Petersburg.

== Stage career ==
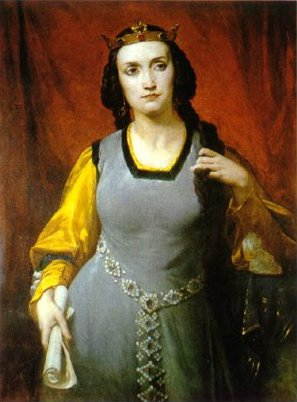
Marie Dorval in Agnès de Méranie by Hippolyte Lazerges (1817–1887)

Marie began acting on stage in earnest following her husband Dorval's death. Eventually she played in staged melodramas, signing contracts with particular theater houses, which was when she started to see some success.

On 12 May 1818 she began her Parisian acting career by playing the role of Pamela in Pamela Married, by the melodramatist Pelletier-Volméranges at the prestigious Porte Saint-Martin Theater. This was probably because of her relationship with Alexandre Piccini (grandson of Nicolas Piccini), who may have interceded on her behalf to get the role.

The reviews were not pleasant after this role, but Dorval was able to in November 1818 gain access to the Paris’ Conservatoire, the teaching organ of the Comédie-Française, again by Piccini's intersession and monthly pension for her. She also benefited from her mother's name, Bordais, as members of her family had both studied and taught there. She studied with the celebrated tragedian, Pierre Lafon.

She did not see great success until the age of 29, when she starred in the French play Trente ans, ou la vie d'un joueur ("Thirty years, or the life of a player.").

She had many successes that did follow, especially in popular productions at the Odéon Theatre. Her last two major appearances were in François Ponsard's Lucrèce (1843) and in Adolphe d'Ennery's Marie-Jeanne, ou la femme du peuple (Marie-Jeanne, Or the Woman of the People, 1845).

Her career began going downhill with a shift in fashion and the public's desire for younger actresses, and she began traveling with a troupe of actors doing small shows around the countryside. By the age of 51, her health was failing due to her long life of travel and shows, and she sank into depression following the death of one of her grandchildren. George Sand assumed the financial support for Dorval's surviving grandchildren following Marie's death in 1849.

== Relationship with George Sand ==
In January 1833, the female writer George Sand met Marie Dorval after the former wrote the actress a letter of appreciation following one of her performances. The two women became involved in an intimate friendship, and were rumored to have become lovers. This has been debated, and never has been verified. Sand wrote about Dorval, including many passages where she is described as smitten with Dorval.

Only those who know how differently we were made can realize how utterly I was in thrall to her...God had given her the power to express what she felt...She was beautiful, and she was simple. She had never been taught anything, but there was nothing she did not know by instinct. I can find no words with which to describe how cold and incomplete my own nature is. I can express nothing. There must be a sort of paralysis in my brain which prevents what I feel from ever finding a form through which it can achieve communication...When she appeared upon the stage, with her drooping figure, her listless gait, her sad and penetrating glance...I can say only that it was as though I were looking at an embodied spirit.

Theater critic Gustave Planche reportedly warned Sand to stay away from Dorval. Likewise, Count Alfred de Vigny, Dorval's lover from 1831 to 1838, warned the actress to stay away from Sand, whom he referred to as "that damned lesbian". Victor Hugo wrote in his own journals that de Vigny was supremely jealous of Hugo's own relationship with Dorval, which could cast doubt on the rumors surrounding Sand and Dorval.

Popular writers from that time, such as Théophile Gautier and Honoré de Balzac, capitalized on the rumors.

Whatever the truth in their relationship, Sand and Dorval remained close friends for the remainder of Dorval's lifetime. In 1834, Dorval starred in Vigny's play Chatterton, and in 1840 she played the lead in a play written by Sand, titled Cosima, and the two women collaborated on the script. However, the play was not well received, and was cancelled after only seven showings.

== In film ==
In the 2025 French TV show La rebelle: Les aventures de la jeune George Sand, Barbara Pravi portrays the character of Dorval, and the show displays an intimate relationship between Dorval (played by Pravi) and George Sand (played by Nine D'Urso).

== In culture ==
Dorval famously said of herself, "I'm not beautiful, I'm worse," which has been quoted repeatedly in years since, sometimes attributed to her and sometimes apocryphally:

- Augustin Filon, in 1901, describing the Dark Lady of Shakespeare's sonnets
- Karl Lagerfeld, legendary fashion designer, describing Anna Piaggi, the influential editor of Vogue Italia
- Jean Baudrillard, describing the essence of seduction in Fatal Strategies, his 1983 book on the hyperreal
