= Adolphe Jadin =

French journalist and writer

- Born: 4 May 1794; Paris
- Died: 2 November 1867 (aged 73); L'Isle-Adam
- Occupations: Journalist, chansonnier, librettist and playwright

Adolphe Jadin (4 May 1794 – 2 November 1867) was a French journalist, chansonnier, librettist and playwright, the son of Louis Emmanuel Jadin.

A bodyguard for Louis XVIII, then for Charles X, captain in the cavalry, his plays were performed on the most important Parisian stages of the 19th century: the Théâtre Beaumarchais, Théâtre de l'Ambigu-Comique, Théâtre national de l'Opéra-Comique, Théâtre des Nouveautés, etc.

== Works ==
- 1814: Serment français, 1814
- 1823: Fanfan et Colas, ou les frères de lait, opéra comique
- 1825: Ronde en l'honneur du sacre de Charles dix, music by Louis-Emmanuel Jadin
- 1826: Le Pari, vaudeville in 1 act, with Théodore Anne
- 1829: Le Vieux marin, ou Une campagne imaginaire, vaudeville in 2 acts, with Théodore Anne and Emmanuel Théaulon
- 1830: Quoniam, comédie en vaudevilles in 2 acts
- 1831: Le Carnaval et les arrêts, ou La Famille impromptu, folie-vaudeville in 1 act
- 1832: Souvenirs de France et d'Écosse
- 1836: L'Amour et l'homéopathie, vaudeville in 2 acts, with Henri de Tully, 1836
- undated: Auprès de toi toute ma vie !, nocturne for 2 voices, music by Louis-Emmanuel Jadin
- undated: La Fête du roi !, music by L. Jadin
- undated: La fille du pauvre, romance, music by Auguste Andrade
- undated: Fuyer cette Beauté cruelle !, romance, music by L. Jadin
- undated: Gentille Adèle !, song, music by L. Jadin
- undated: Trois Nocturnes à 2 voix, music by L. Jadin
- undated: Album lyrique composé de douze romances, chansonnettes & nocturnes, with twelve lithographies by Jules David

== Bibliography ==
- Sainte-Preuve, Biographie universelle et portative des contemporains, vol.2, 1836, p. 2154-2155
- Louis Gustave Vapereau, L'année littéraire et dramatique: 1858-1868, 1868, p. 427
