= Henri de Latouche =

French writer (1785–1851)

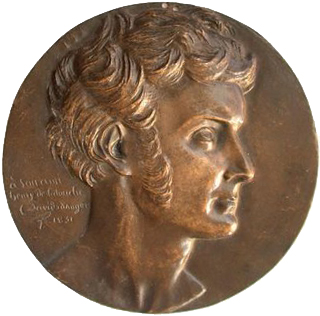
Henri de Latouche

Hyacinthe-Joseph Alexandre Thabaud de Latouche, commonly known as Henri de Latouche (2 February 1785 – 9 March 1851) was a French poet and novelist known for his publication of André Chénier and early encouragement of George Sand. (His family name is also seen as "Thabaud de La Touche" and even sometimes "Delatouche".)

== Life ==
He was born at La Châtre (Indre).

Among his works may be distinguished his comedies: Projets de sagesse (1811), and, in collaboration with Émile Deschamps, Selmours de Florian (1818), which ran for a hundred nights; also La Reine d'Espagne (1831), which proved too indecent for the public taste; a novel, Fragoletta ou Naples et Paris en 1799 (1829), which attained success of notoriety; La Vallée aux Loups (1833), a volume of prose essays and verse; and two volumes of poems, Les Adieus, (1843) and Les Agrestes (1844).

Latouche's chief claim to remembrance is that he revealed to the world the genius of André Chénier, then only known to a limited few. The remains of the poet's work had passed from the hands of Daunou to Latouche, who had sufficient critical insight instantly to recognize their value. In editing the first selection of Chénier's poems (1819) he made some trifling emendations, but did not, as Beranger afterwards asserted, make radical and unnecessary changes.

Latouche was guilty of more than one literary fraud. He caused a licentious story of his own to be attributed to the duchess of Duras, the irreproachable author of Ourika. He made many enemies by malicious attacks on his contemporaries. The Constitutionnel was suppressed in 1817 by the government for an obscure political allusion in an article by Latouche. He then undertook the management of the Mercure du XIXe siècle, and began a bitter warfare against the monarchy.

After 1830 he edited Le Figaro, and spared neither the liberal politicians nor the romanticists who triumphed under the monarchy of July. In his turn he was violently attacked by Gustave Planche in the Revue des deux mondes for November 1831. Latouche did much to encourage George Sand at the beginning of her career.

The last twenty years of his life were spent in retirement at Val d’Aulnay.

Sainte-Beuve, in the Causeries du lundi, vol. 3, gives a not too sympathetic portrait of Latouche. See also George Sand in the Siecle for the 18th, 19th and 20 July 1851.
