= Auguste Andrade =

French singer and composer

Jean (or Jacob) Auguste Andrade (12 August 1793 – 11 January 1843) was a French singer and composer.

== Biography ==
Born in Saint-Esprit (Pyrénées-Atlantiques), son of Rabbi Abraham Andrade, a student of Pierre-Jean Garat and Antoine Ponchard at the Conservatoire de Paris, in 1820 he won First Prize in singing. Professor of vocal music, singer (tenor) of the Orchestre de la Société des concerts du Conservatoire, we owe him romances and nocturnes published at Petibon et Schlesinger.

Andrade died in Paris on 11 January 1843.

== Works ==
Among his numerous compositions:

Singer

- Messes en mi bémol majeur, 4-part choir and orchestra, 1816.
- Adjutor in oportunitatibus in F major, 4-part choir and orchestra, 1818.

Composer

- Le Départ du matelot, ballade, lyrics by Casimir Delavigne, 1827.
- Le Berger d'Appenzel, singing, piano, c. 1830.
- L'Exilé, singing, piano, c. 1830.
- La promenade sur l'eau, two-voice barcarolla, lyrics by Ulric Guttinguer, 1830.
- La Magicienne, singing, piano, 1835.
- Pleure petite fille, singing, piano, 1835.
- Un ciel étranger, singing, piano, 1835.
- C'est bien la peine d'être sage, ditty, undated.

Publications

- Une leçon de vocalise, with Antoine Romagnesi, 1825.
- Méthode de chant et de vocalisation, undated.

== Bibliography ==
- Charles Gabet, Dictionnaire des artistes de l’école française au XIXe siècle, 1834, p. 9.
- François-Joseph Fétis, Biographie universelle des musiciens, 1860, p. 97.
- Paul Vandevijvere, Dictionnaire des compositeurs francs-maçons, 2015 (Read online).
