= Panhypocrisiade =

French poem by Louis Jean Népomucène Lemercier

La Panhypocrisiade, ou la comédie infernale du seizième siècle (The Panhypocrisiade, or The Infernal Comedy of the Sixteenth Century) is a poem in sixteen cantos by Louis Jean Népomucène Lemercier, composed essentially under the French Consulate but not published until 1819 (see 1819 in poetry).

The work is similar to Tragiques by Agrippa d'Aubigné, which has a similar style. The poem contains a conversation between a worm and Death, the complaints of an oak tree assailed by soldiers, an argument between Martin Luther and the Devil, and a visit to Rabelais by Reason personified, among other étrangetés.

A passage from the section featuring Rabelais gives an idea of the surprising style of this poem:

C'est Carême-Prenant, que l'orgueil mortifie:
Son peuple, ichtyophage, efflanqué, vaporeux,
A l'oreille qui tinte et l'esprit rêve-creux.
Envisage non loin ces zélés Papimanes,
Qui, sur l'amour divin, sont plus forts que des ânes,
Et qui, béats fervents, engraissés de tous biens,
Rôtissent mainte andouille et maints luthériens.
Ris de la nation des moines gastrolâtres:
Aperçois-tu le dieu don't ils sont idolâtres?
Ce colosse arrondi, grondant, sourd, et sans yeux,
Premier auteur des arts cultivés sous les cieux,
Seul roi des volontés, tyran des consciences,
Et maître ingénieux de toutes les sciences,
C'est le ventre ! le ventre ! Oui, messire Gaster
Des hommes de tout temps fut le grand magister,
Et toujours se vautra la canaille insensée
Pour ce dieu, don't le trône est la selle percée.
J'en pleure et ris ensemble; et tour à tour je crois
Retrouver Héraclite et Démocrite en moi.
Hu ! hu ! dis-je en pleurant, quoi ! ce dieu qui digère,
Quoi ! tant d'effets si beaux, le ventre les opère!
Hu ! hu ! lamentons-nous ! hu ! quels honteux destins,
De nous tant agiter pour nos seuls intestins!
Hu ! hu ! hu ! de l'esprit quel pitoyable centre!
L'homme en tous ses travaux a donc pour but le ventre!
Mais tel que Grand-Gousier pleurant sur Badebec,
Se tournant vers son fils sent ses larmes à sec;
Hi ! hi ! dis-je en riant, hi ! hi ! hi ! quel prodige,
Qu'ainsi depuis Adam le ventre nous oblige
À labourer, semer, moissonner, vendanger,
Bâtir, chasser, pêcher, combattre, naviguer,
Peindre, chanter, danser, forger, filer et coudre,
Alambiquer, peser les riens, l'air et la poudre,
Étre prédicateurs, poètes, avocats,
Titrer, mitrer, bénir, couronner des Midas,
Nous lier à leur cour comme à l'unique centre,
Hi ! hi ! tout cela, tout, hi ! hi ! hi ! pour le ventre!
(From Canto 11)

A fully digitized copy of the 1819 edition of the text can be found by searching the Gallica project of the Bibliothèque Nationale de France.
