= Joseph-François-Nicolas Dusaulchoy de Bergemont =

French writer and journalist (1760–1835)

- Born: 21 February 1760; Toul
- Died: 25 July 1835 (aged 75); Paris
- Occupations: Journalist, playwright, writer

Joseph-François-Nicolas Dusaulchoy de Bergemont (21 February 1760 – 25 July 1835) was a French playwright, writer and journalist.

Dusaulchoy first spent some time in Holland, where he cooperated with the editorial board of the Gazette d’Amsterdam. Back in France, he embraced with enthusiasm the principles of the French Revolution and wrote successively for the Courrier national, le Républicain, for Les Révolutions de France et de Brabant from July to December 1791 following the departure of Camille Desmoulins, for the Semaine politique et littéraire during the first trimester of 1792, then, under the 1st Républic, for le Batave or le Sans-culotte.

Jailed during the Reign of Terror, he was released after the Fall of Robespierre and towards the end of 1796, entered the offices of the police ministry where he was responsible for monitoring newspapers. After he was no longer in that position, he was attached to the direction of the Journal des arts, des sciences et de la littérature, then to that of the Courrier de l’Europe, which later was incorporated into the Journal de Paris.

== Works ==
- 1792–1793: Almanach du peuple, 1792–1793, 2 vol. in-18.
- 1797: Confédération générale des fidèles et leur réunion au tombeau de Louis XVI, in-8°.
- an XIII (1805): Histoire du couronnement de Napoléon, discours préliminaire de Joseph Lavallée, Paris, Debrar, in-8°.
- 1811: Rappel des dieux, ou le Conseil céleste, scènes héroïques pour la naissance du roi de Rome, in-8°.
- 1811: Épitres à Esménard, in-8°.
- 1817: Soirées de famille, recueil philosophique, moral et divertissant, 3 vol. in-12.
- 1817: Le Censeur ambigu, littéraire, politique et philosophique, 2 vol. in-12.
- 1820: Mahomet II, ou les Captifs vénitiens (with Pierre-Joseph Charrin), heroic drama in 3 acts, presented at the Théâtre de la Porte-Saint-Martin 4 November.
- 1822: Le Protégé de tout le monde, comédie en vaudeville in 1 act, with Aimé Desprez and Alexandre-Joseph Le Roy de Bacre, théâtre de la Porte-Saint-Martin, 12 November.
- Mosaïque historique, littéraire et politique, etc.
- Odes.

== Sources ==
- François-Xavier Feller and Charles Weiss : Biographie universelle : ou, dictionnaire historique des hommes qui se sont fait un nom par leur génie, leurs talents, leurs vertus, leurs erreurs ou leurs crimes t. 3, Paris, 1867, 716 p. Read online (p. 371–372)
