= Eugène de Gaville =

French poet and playwright

Eugène Picart de Gaville, (Étampes, 1804 – ?) was a 19th-century French poet and playwright.

Although he seems to have participated in the writing of several dramatic works, his name is attached to very few publications.

== Works ==
- 1829: Mon oncle le bossu, ou les Deux pupilles, one-act comedy in prose, with W. Lafontaine and Mélesville
- 1854: Les Soirs, poetry

== Bibliography ==
- J. Hippolyte Daniel, Biographie des hommes remarquables de Seine-et-Oise, 1837, (p. 254)
