= Louis-Emmanuel Jadin =

French composer, pianist and harpsichordist

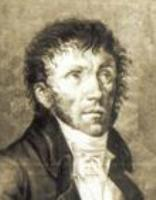
Louis-Emmanuel Jadin.

Louis-Emmanuel Jadin (21 September 1768 – 11 April 1853) was a French composer, pianist and harpsichordist.

Jadin was born in Versailles. He learned piano from his brother Hyacinthe Jadin and later worked at the Théâtre de Monsieur. His first opera was staged in Versailles in 1788. The following year he took the position of second keyboardist at the Théâtre de Monsieur. In 1792 he became a musician in the National Guard. In 1802 he acted as a professor of music and in 1806 was director of the Théâtre Molière. He later won fame as a pianist and taught at the Paris Conservatory. He was made Chevalier of the Légion d’honneur in 1824. Many of his works were published in Paris, where he died. The playwright and chansonnier Adolphe Jadin was his son.

== Selected works ==
=== Operas ===
- 1788 Guerre ouverte ou Ruse contre ruse 3 Acts
- 1790 Constance et Gernand 1 Act
- 1790 Joconde after Jean de La Fontaine 3 Acts
- 1790 La religieuse danoise ou La communauté de Copenhague 3 Acts (also called Le Duce de Waldeza)
- 1791 La vengeance du bailli ou La suite d'Annette et Lubin 2 Acts
- 1791 L'heureux stratagème 2 Acts
- 1792 Amélie de Monfort 3 Acts
- 1792 L'avare puni 1 Act
- 1793 Les talismans 3 Acts
- 1793 Le coin de feu 1 Act
- 1793 Le siège de Thionville 2 Acts
- 1794 Le congrès des rois 3 Acts (a collaboration by 12 composers)
- 1794 Alisbelle ou Les crimes de la féodalité 3 Acts
- 1794 L'apothéose du jeune Barra 1 Act
- 1794 Agricol Viala ou Le jeune héros de la durance 1 Act
- 1794 L'ecolier en vacances 1 Act
- 1795 Le cabaleur 1 Act
- 1795 Le lendemain de noces 1 Act
- 1795 Loizerolles ou L'héroïsme paternel 1 Act
- 1796 Le mariage de la veille 1 Act
- 1796 Mélusine et Gerval (Méline et Ferval)
- 1796 Le négociant de Boston 1 Act
- 1796 Les deux Lettres 1 Act
- 1796 Le défi hasardeux 2 Acts
- 1797 Les bons voisins 1 Act
- 1798 Candos ou Les sauvages du Canada 3 Acts
- 1798 La paix ou Le triomphe de l'humanité
- 1803 Mahomet II 3 Acts
- 1804 Jean Bart et Patoulet 1 Act
- 1804 Mon cousin de Paris 1 Act
- 1804 La grand-mère 2 Acts
- 1805 Les trois prétendus 1 Act
- 1805 Le grand-père ou Les deux ages 1 Act
- 1805 Charles Coypel ou La vengeance d'un peintre 1 Act
- 1806 Les deux aveugles de Tolède 1 Act
- 1807 Les arts et l'amitié
- 1810 La partie de campagne 1 Act
- 1812 L'auteur malgré lui ou La pièce tombée 1 Act
- 1816 L'inconnu ou Le coup d'épée viager 3 Acts
- 1817 La gueule du lion ou La mère esclave 3 Acts
- 1822 Fanfan et Colas ou Les frères de lait 1 Act
- Jean et Geneviève (unperformed)

=== Orchestral ===
- Fantaisie concertante in g for Harp, Piano, and Orchestra
  1. Allegro risoluto
  2. Adagio
  3. Allegro moderato
- 4th Piano concerto in D minor (1810)
  1. Allegro maestoso
  2. Siciliano. Larghetto
  3. Finale. Chasse
- Symphonie concertante for Clarinet, Horn, Bassoon and Orchestra (1803)

=== Concert Band ===
- Marche en F (1794)
- Ouverture en C (1794)
- Pas de manoeuvre en F (1794)
- Symphonie en F (1794)
- Suites d’harmonies militaires

=== Mass ===
- Requiem for 3 solo voices, 3 trombones, and double-bass

=== Chamber music ===
- Sonate en ré Majeur for harpsichord with flute obligée
- Sonate en sol majeur opus X n° 3 for harpsichord or piano-forte, flute, and bass
- Sonate en sol majeur opus XIII n° 1 for piano-forte, flûte et basse
- Sonate en sol majeur for harpsichord or piano-forte with flute accompagnement
- 4 Arien for Horn and Harp
- Duo for Harp and Piano
- Trois grands quatuors for two violons, alto, and violoncelle

== Media ==
Nocturne No. 3 in G minor
1. Allegro – Adagio espressivo

2. Allegro molto
Performed by the Soni Ventorum Wind Quintet
