= Charles Rondeau (playwright) =

French playwright

Charles Rondeau was a 19th-century French playwright. Often signing his participations Charles, his plays were presented on numerous Parisian stages of the 19th century including the Théâtre de la Gaîté, the Théâtre du Vaudeville, and the Théâtre des Variétés.

== Works ==
- 1813: La Coutume écossaise ou Le Mariage sur la frontière, comédie en vaudeville in 1 act, with Alexandre de Ferrière
- 1819: Cadet Butteux, électeur à Lyon, vaudeville politique, with Victor Ducange
- 1829: Les Petits braconniers, ou la Capitulation, comedy in 1 act, mingled with couplets, with Nicolas Brazier and Jean-Toussaint Merle
- 1829: Les Ricochets, one-act comedy de Picard, set in couplets and arranged for the Théâtre Comte
- 1830: Madame Grégoire ou Le cabaret de la Pomme de pin, comédie en vaudeville in 2 acts, with Edmond Rochefort and Charles Dupeuty
- 1836: La Grue, fabliau mêlé de chant, with de Ferdinand de Villeneuve and Charles de Livry
- 1837: La fille de Dominique, comédie vaudeville en un acte, with de Villeneuve
