= Ramond de la Croisette =

French playwright (1796-1849)

Paul Alexis Raymond de la Croisette, called Charles (Paris, 14 April 1796 – Paris, 10 July 1849) was a 19th-century French playwright.

== Biography ==
An archivist at the French Chamber of Deputies, his plays, often signed Charles, were presented on the most important Parisian stages of his lifetime: Théâtre de l'Odéon, Théâtre du Vaudeville, Théâtre du Gymnase-Dramatique etc.

Following a trial with the management of the Théâtre du Vaudeville related to the play La leçon de Mathématiques, none of his plays was ever presented. In 1834, he was admitted yet in the Société du Caveau which may suggest that he still published at that time under a pen name which has not been identified.

== Œuvres ==
- 1817: L'hôtel Bazancourt, vaudeville en 1 acte, 1817
- 1820: Les marieurs écossais ou Une matinée à Gretna-Green, comédie vaudeville in 1 act
- 1820: La Suite du Folliculaire ou l'Article en suspens, comédie-vaudeville in 1 act, with Armand d'Artois, Langlé, Eugène Scribe and Théaulon
- 1821: Le Baptême de village, ou le Parrain de circonstance, vaudeville in 1 act, with de Bury, Chavagnac and Ledoux
- 1821: La Créancière, comédie-vaudeville in 2 acts, with Emmanuel Théaulon
- 1822: Les Femmes romantiques, comédie-vaudeville, avec Théaulon, 1822
- 1822: Une journée à Montmorency, tableau-vaudeville in 1 act, with Théaulon and Ferdinand Langlé, 1822
- 1822: Une visite aux Invalides, à-propos mingled with couplets on the occasion of Saint-Louis's day
- 1823: Le Magasin de lumière, scènes à-propos de l'éclairage par le gaz, with Langlé, Mathurin-Joseph Brisset and Théaulon
- 1823: Le comte d'Angoulême, ou Le siège de Gênes, with Fulgence de Bury, Michel-Joseph Gentil de Chavagnac and Paul Ledoux
- 1823: Le siège de Gênes, comédie héroïque in 2 acts, with Chavagnac, Ledoux and de Bury
- 1824: Mr Manuel, 1824
- 1824: Mes derniers vingt sols, vaudeville in 1 act, with Théaulon
- 1824: Grétry, opéra-comique in 1 act, with de Bury and Ledoux
- 1825: Le Béarnais, ou la Jeunesse de Henri IV, comedy in 1 act and in free verses, with de Bury and Ledoux
- 1826: La Fête du roi, ou le Remède à la goutte, comedy in 1 act and in verses, with Paul Ledoux
- 1827: La leçon de mathématiques, comédie-vaudeville in 1 act
- 1828: J'épouse ma femme, vaudeville in 1 act
- undated: Mon rêve, ou J'étais ministre

== Honours ==
- Chevalier de la Légion d'honneur (14 mai 1845)
- Officier de la Légion d'honneur (23 mai 1848)

== Bibliography ==
- Joseph Marie Quérard, La France littéraire ou dictionnaire bibliographique, vol.7, 1835, p. 448 (Lire en ligne)
