= Richard Fabert =

French playwright

Richard Fabert called Richard was a 19th-century French playwright.

== Biography ==
His name appeared in three plays given in 1812 at the Théâtre du Vaudeville and in 1816 at the Théâtre de la Gaîté for an adaptation of Molière performed at the Théâtre de l'Odéon as well as in 1825 for a play which seems to not have been presented It is probably a still unidentified pseudonym.

In 1861 Bénoit ainé published Les Plaintes d'Hégésippe Moreau on lyrics by Adolphe Carcassonne of which he would be the composer but nothing proves that it is the same author as that of the theater plays.

== Works ==
- 1812: Arlequin-Lucifer, ou Cassandre alchimiste, folie in 1 act mingled with couplets, with Alexandre de Ferrière
- 1812: Amour et loyauté, ou le Mariage militaire, one-act comedy, mingled with couplets, with de Ferrière
- 1812: Le Dénouement en l'air, ou Expérience de vol, folie in 1 act, with Charles-Gaspard Delestre-Poirson
- 1816: Le Dépit amoureux, comedy in 1 act and in verse by Molière, adapted by Richard Fabert
- 1825: L'Homme au scrupule, comedy
- 1875: Charlemagne, drama

== Bibliography ==
- Joseph Marie Quérard, Les supercheries littéraires dévoilées, 1852, (p. 112)
- Joseph Marie Quérard, La France littéraire, 1857, (p. 144)
