= Alexandre-Joseph Le Roy de Bacre =

French playwright

Alexandre-Joseph Le Roy de Bacre, born in Paris, was a 19th-century French playwright.

== Biography ==
He first made a career in the army as an officer before devoting himself to theater. He attended the military school in Ventimiglia and served as a lieutenant during the campaigns of 1792–1793 and was Dumouriez's aide-de-camp, following him during his flight to Austria. He then served Austria before returning to France where he was reincorporated in the regiment of the reigning prince of Isenburg and became his aide-de-camp.

He then served in the Napoleonic armies and participated to the last campaigns as assistant captain of the General Staff.

His plays were presented on the most important Parisian stages of the 19th century: Théâtre de la Porte-Saint-Martin, Théâtre de la Gaité, Théâtre du Vaudeville, etc.

== Works ==
- 1795: Le Passage du Waal ou les Amants républicains, opéra comique
- 1801: La Femme romanesque, comedy in 1 act and in prose
- 1806: Caroline et Dorville ou la Bataille dans les dunes, melodrama in 3 acts, with Louis de Moranges
- 1816: Malhek-Adhel, drama in 3 acts
- 1820: Monsieur David, comédie anecdotique in 1 act and in prose, with Alexandre Martin
- 1821: Isabelle de Levanzo, ou la Fille écuyer, melodrama in 3 acts and great extravaganza, with René Perin
- 1822: Le Protégé de tout le monde, comédie en vaudevilles en 1 act, with Aimé Desprez and Joseph-François-Nicolas Dusaulchoy de Bergemont
- 1824: Les Hussards, ou le Maréchal des logis piémontais, mimodrama in 2 acts, extravaganza
- 1825: Le Vieillard ou la Révélation, melodrama in 2 acts, with Henri Franconi
- 1826: La Famille Girard, ou les Prisonniers français, tableau militaire anecdote in 1 act, with Armand Séville
- 1826: Joseph II ou l'Inconnu au cabaret, comédie-vaudeville, with Félix-Auguste Duvert and W. Lafontaine
- 1828: La Prison de village, comedy in 1 act, with Frédéric de Courcy
- 1829: Le Panier d'argenterie, mélodrame anecdotique in 3 acts, from Nouvelles by Merville
- 1833: Le Fils naturel, ou l'Insulte, drama in 3 acts

== Bibliography ==
- A. Jay, Antoine-Vincent Arnault, E. Jouy, Biographie nouvelle des contemporains, 1823, (p. 399)
- Joseph-Marie Quérard, La France littéraire, 1833, (p. 223)
