= Mercure du XIXe siècle =

1823–1830 French literary magazine

The Mercure du XIXe siècle (sometimes listed as Mercure français du XIXe siècle) was a French literary magazine published from 1823 to 1830. It was edited by Henri de Latouche and was famous for the first published use of the word "realism" (1826) applied to literature. The review was notable for its opposition to Romanticism and for publishing such early 19th-century poets and writers as Senancour.

The Mercure du XIX siècle ("Mercury of the 19th century") modelled its name on another journal, the Mercure de France, which ceased publication in 1824. The name Mercure refers to Mercury, the messenger of the gods.
