= Marc-Antoine Madeleine Désaugiers =

French composer (1772–1827)

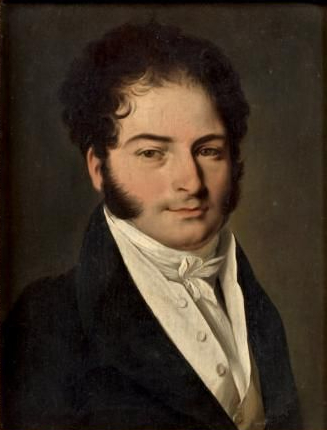
Louis-Léopold Boilly, Portrait of Marc-Antoine Madeleine Désaugiers, early 19th century

Marc-Antoine Madeleine Désaugiers (17 November 1772 – 9 August 1827) was a French composer, dramatist, and songwriter.

Désaugiers is easily confused in historical writings with his father, Marc-Antoine Désaugiers (1742 in Fréjus – 10 September 1793 in Paris), who was himself a composer of eleven operatic works, mostly comedies, for the stages of Paris, and left ten stage compositions unperformed. Both father and son died in their early 50s.

== Biography ==
Desaugiers was born in Fréjus (Var), son of an accomplished composer for the stage. He studied at the Collège des Quatre-Nations, known as "Mazarin College" in Paris, where he had for one of his teachers the critic Julien Louis Geoffroy. He entered the Saint-Lazare seminary with a view to the priesthood, but soon gave up his intention. In his nineteenth year he produced in collaboration with his father a light opera (1791) adapted from Le Médecin malgré lui of Molière.

During the French Revolution he emigrated to Santo Domingo, and during the Negro revolt he was made prisoner, barely escaping with his life. He took refuge in the United States, where he supported himself by teaching the piano. In 1797, he returned to his native country, and in a very few years he became famous as a writer of comedies, operas and vaudevilles, which were produced in rapid succession at the Théâtre des Variétés and the Vaudeville. He also wrote convivial and satirical songs, which, though different in character, can only worthily be compared with those of Béranger. He was at one time president of the Ceveau, a convivial society whose members were then chiefly drawn from literary circles. He had the honor of introducing Béranger as a member. In 1815, Désaugiers succeeded Pierre Yves Barr as manager of the Vaudeville, which prospered under his management until, in 1820, the opposition of the Gymnase proved too strong for him, and he resigned.

Désaugiers died in Paris at the age of 55.

Among his pieces may be mentioned Le Valet d'emprunt (1807); Monsieur Vautour (1811); and Le Règne d'un terme et le terme d'un règne, aimed at Napoleon. Among his collaborators was Eugène Scribe.

An edition of Désaugiers' Chansons et Poésies diverses appeared in 1827. A new selection with a foreword by Alfred de Bougy appeared in 1858. See also Sainte-Beuve's Portraits contemporains, vol. V.
