= Jules David =

French painter and lithographer (1808–1892)

- Born: Jean-Baptiste David; 1808
- Died: 1892 (aged 83–84)
- Occupations: Painter and lithographer
- Known for: Illustrations in the Moniteur de la Mode

Jean-Baptiste David (called Jules David; 1808–1892) was a French painter and lithographer. His illustrations appeared in many books and magazines. He was particularly known for his illustrations of contemporary Parisian fashions.

== Early years ==
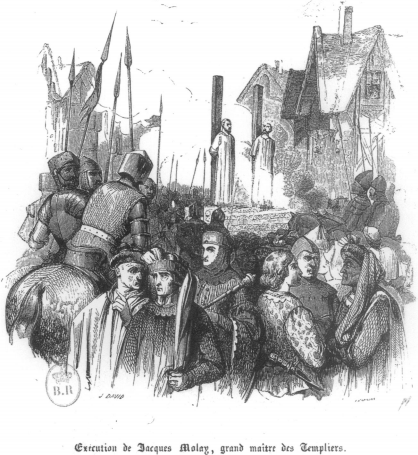
Execution of Jacques Molay from the 1839 Histoire de France

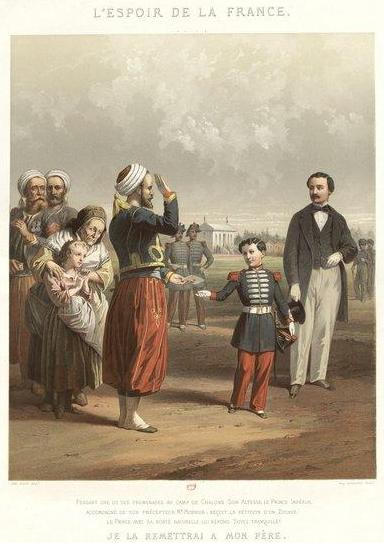
The Hope of France - Napoléon, Prince Imperial (1856–1879) accepting a petition from a Zouave

Jean-Baptiste David was born in 1808. He was a pupil of Pierre Duval Le Camus, who painted moralistic subjects. Duval was in turn a pupil of the famous painter Jacques-Louis David. Jean-Baptiste David began work in 1824, using his power of observation and facility of drawing to produce a variety of landscapes and interiors in Gothic style for publishers.

During the July Monarchy (1830–1848) David also published caricatures. He belonged to the mouvement party, and wanted to implement the ideals of liberty and the French republic. He derided the juste milieu of King Louis Philippe as a trick to prevent these ideals being achieved. A caricature by David appeared in La Caricature of 31 May 1831. The king is depicted as an illusionist who uses the juste milieu and some poudre de non-intervention to make liberty and revolution vanish. David's lithographs often attacked political tyranny, and religious hypocrisy.

David exhibited in the Salon of 1834. He was working for the editor Jeannin in 1836 when he won a 2,000 franc prize from Delessert, president of the Savings Bank of Paris, for a work about the triumph of Virtue. His album Vice and Virtue illustrated in twelve lithographs a good or bad action in each stage of life. Six plates were dedicated to vice and six to virtue. The one series showed the criminals arrested, taken to prison and on the scaffold. The other series showed scenes of work, study and so on. The work was praised for the quality of the drawings but criticized for its tendentious moralization.

In 1839 the Histoire de France by Théodose Burette was published with 500 drawings by David, engraved by V. Chevin. L'Artiste announced the book, saying the illustrations would make the book "doubly popular". The next year L'Artiste gave a six-page review of the book, with reproductions of twelve of the illustrations, saying it was one of the most remarkable publications to have appeared for a long time.

Six plates published by Jeannin in 1844 titled Le Moyen-Age. Moeurs et Coutumes (The Middle Ages, Customs and Costumes) depicted nobles absorbed in religion and beggars living on charity. David's compositions were lively and often humorous, in the style of Victor Adam and François Grenier. They were published until around 1855 in the Musée de l'amateur, the Revue des peintres and L'Artiste. His best known works are the series of The Wandering Jew and The Mysteries of Paris, and the illustrations of Morality in Action and the History of Napoleon. He also made lithographs for many romance titles.

== Fashion illustrations ==
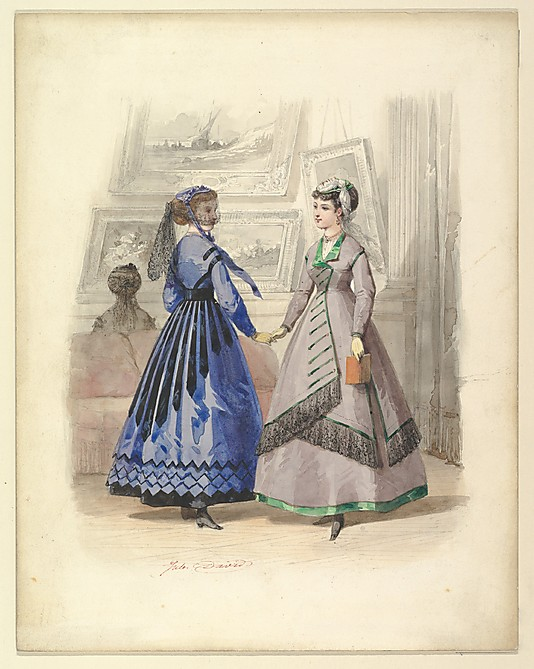
Two Women in an Art Gallery (1868)

Achille Devéria introduced David to the Journal des demoiselles and the Journal des jeunes personnes, for which he produced lithographs from 1839 to 1842. David's albums were often published as a supplement to women's magazines. He drew all the plates for the Le Moniteur de la Mode for fifty years. About 2,600 of David's fashion plates were first published in the Moniteur de la Mode, and then republished in other magazines in France, Germany, Britain, Spain and America. He was a pioneer in introducing contemporary backgrounds in his plates. In 1860 Samuel Orchart Beeton, husband of Mrs Beeton and publisher of the Englishwoman's Domestic Magazine, began to include hand-colored fashion plates by David. These let his readers see the latest styles and colors from Paris, the world fashion center at the time. Beeton included paper patterns, which let owners of the newly introduced domestic sewing machines make their own dresses.

Jean-Baptiste David died in 1892. In 1987 his sketchbooks were shown in an exhibition called Fashion drawings of Jules David (1808–1892) and his time at the Salon du Vieux-Colombier, town hall of the sixth arrondissement, Paris. During his long career, the fashionable figure was transformed. The delicate Dresden figurine of 1870, dressed in a modest, elaborate and very feminine style, was displaced by the "seven foot beauty with the ten inch waist" of 1893. The modern woman of 1893 was much more self-confident and her dress much more revealing and sophisticated than would have been suitable twenty years earlier.

== Selected work ==
David illustrated the following works, among many others:

- Histoire populaire, anecdotique et pittoresque de Napoléon et de la grande armée, 1 vol. (650 p.) 1843 Paris G. Kugelmann
- Léonie, valse brillante 3 p.: cover illustration; 35 cm Edition : [1848] Paris Veuve Launer
- Oeuvres complètes de Molière 1 vol. (384 p.) Edition: [1870] Paris Librairie du "Petit journal" by Molière (1622-1673)
- Histoire de Don Quichotte 1 vol. (100 p.) DL 1887 Paris Garnier frères by Miguel de Cervantes Saavedra (1547-1616), translated by Jean-Pierre Claris de Florian (1755-1794)
- Départ des paysans fantaisie pour piano 4 p.: illustration; [1897] Paris Veuve E. Benoît

Some of his lithographs include:

- Le Comte de Paris 1 est.: 18,8 x 15,2 cm
- Eugénie Impératrice des Français. 30 Janvier 1853 1 est. monochrome 29,5 x 21,7 cm
- Mgr l'Archevêque de Paris, blessé mortellement au Fg Saint-Antoine (25 Juin) Que mon sang soit le dernier versé !.. 1 est. 24,5 x 36,3 cm
- Le Peuple au Palais des Tuileries. 24 Février 1 est. monochrome; 28,6 x 42,1 cm
- Philippe 1er 1 est. 39 x 25,6 cm
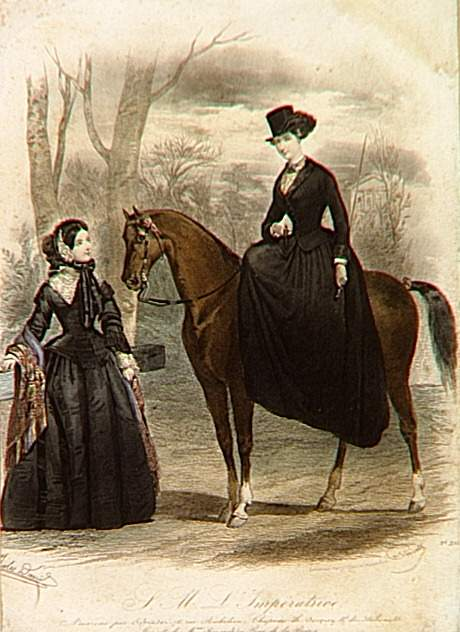
Her Majesty Empress Eugénie in riding dress

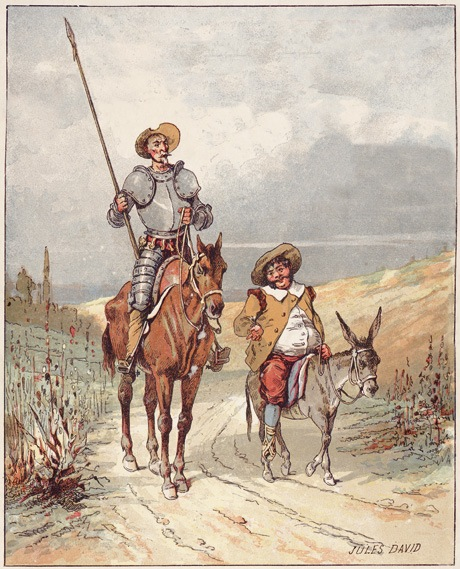
Don Quixote and Sancho Panza

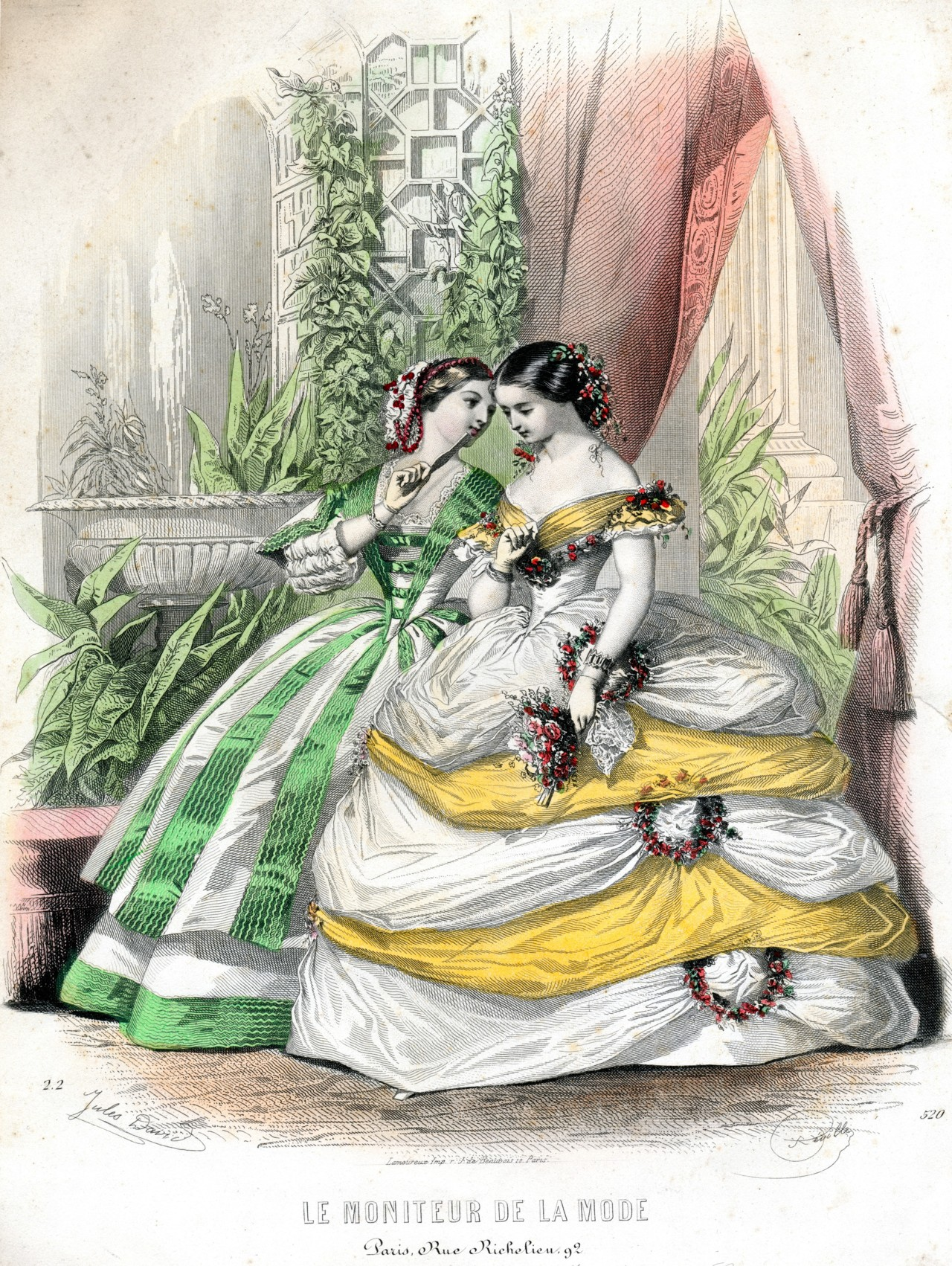
Fashion illustration from La Moniteur de la Mode

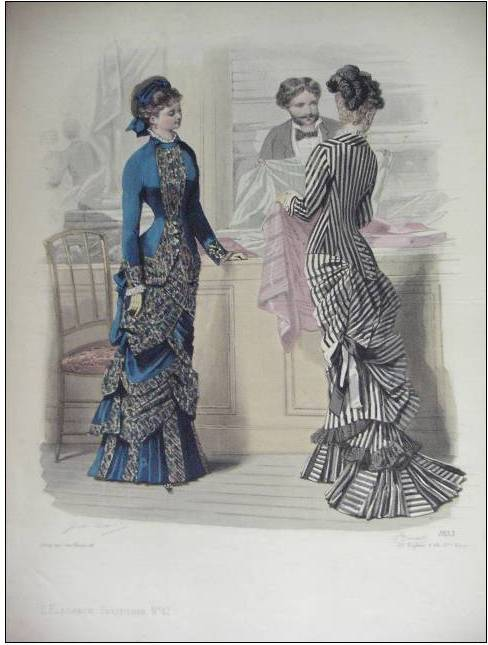
Parisian Elegance

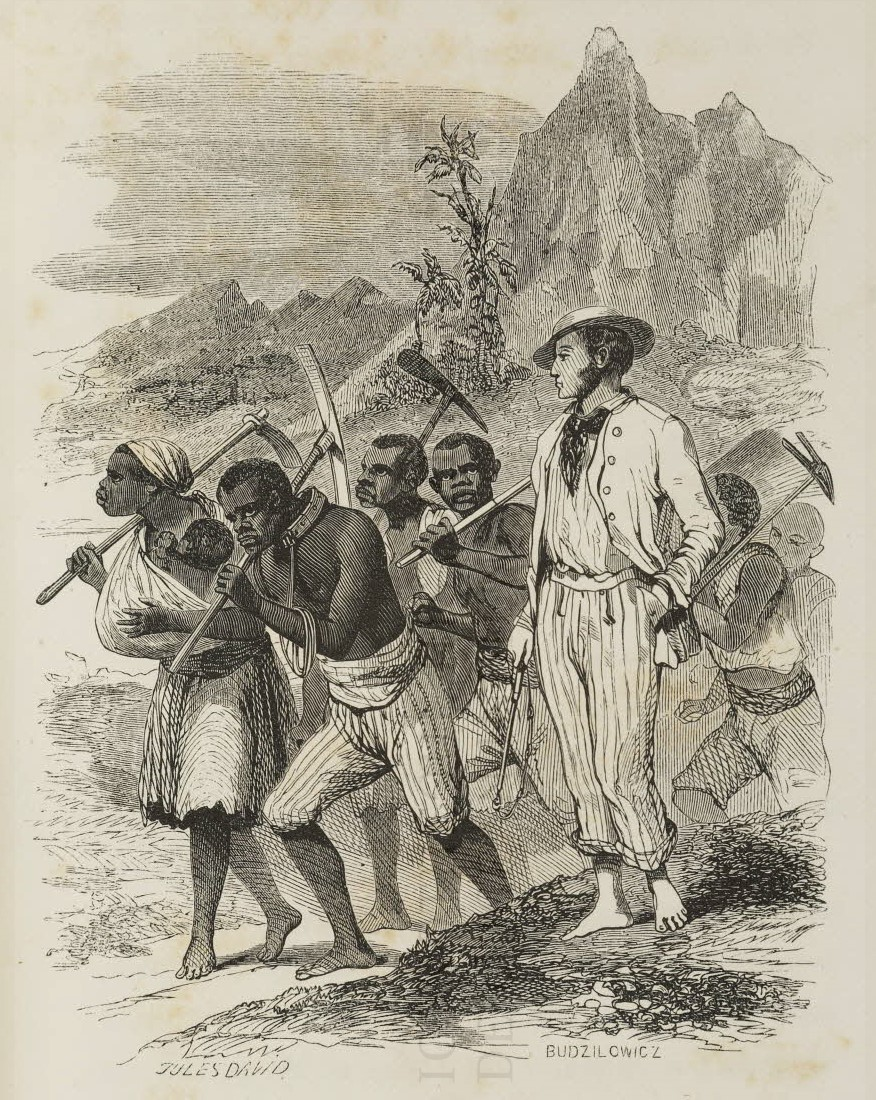
Slaves going to work in Bourbon island (La Réunion)
