= Henri de Tully =

French librettist and playwright (1798–1846)

Henry de Tully
- Born: Jules-Henry de Tully; 1 May 1798; Paris, France
- Died: 12 July 1846 (aged 48); Paris, France
- Occupations: Librettist, plawright

Jules-Henry de Tully (1 May 1798 – 12 July 1846) was a French librettist and playwright.

== Life ==
A deputy Commissioner of the king at the Monnaie de Paris, a member of the Société Lyrique, an administrator of the Théâtre du Luxembourg, he was co-founder of the Théâtre Beaumarchais (1835) with Théodore Ferdinand Vallou de Villeneuve.

His theatre plays, often signed with the collective pseudonym Charles Henri were presented on the most famous Parisian stages of the 19th century, including the Théâtre du Palais-Royal, the Théâtre de la Porte Saint-Antoine, and the Théâtre du Vaudeville.

An editor at La Psyché, he also authored several songs.

== Works ==
- 1822: Les Dames Martin, ou le Mari, la femme et la veuve, comédie en vaudevilles in 1 act, with Gabriel-Alexandre Belle
- 1825: L'Exilé, vaudeville in 2 acts, after Old Mortality by Walter Scott, with Théodore Anne and Achille d'Artois
- 1827: Le Mari par intérim, comédie en vaudevilles in 1 act, with Fulgence de Bury and Charles Nombret Saint-Laurent
- 1827: L'Orpheline et l'héritière, comédie en vaudevilles en 2 acts, with Théodore Anne
- 1828: M. Rossignol, ou le Prétendu de province, folie-vaudeville en 1 act, with Félix-Auguste Duvert
- 1829: L'humoriste, vaudeville in 1 act, with Fulgence de Bury and Charles Dupeuty
- 1831: Le Fils du colonel, drama in 1 act, mingled with couplets
- 1831: La Plus belle nuit de la vie, comédie en vaudeville in 1 act, with Desvergers and Charles Varin
- 1833: Le Singe et l'adjoint, folie-vaudeville in 1 act, with Duvert
- 1836: L'Amour et l'homoeopathie, vaudeville in 2 acts, with Adolphe Jadin and Alphonse Salin
- 1837: Le Chemin de fer de Saint-Germain, A-propos-vaudeville in 1 act, with Jean Pierre Charles Perrot de Renneville
- 1837: Zizine, ou l'École de déclamation, vaudeville in 1 act
- 1939: Le Plus court chemin, comedy in 1 act, mingled with couplets
- 1840: Misère et génie, drama in 1 act, with A. Desroziers
- 1841: La Mère et l'enfant se portent bien, comédie en vaudevilles in 1 act, with Alfred Desroziers and Dumanoir
- 1844: Les fils de télémaque, vaudeville in 1 act, with Jautard
- 1848: Les Fils de Télémaque, vaudeville in 1 act, with Armand-Numa Jautard
- 1867: Qu'est c'que ça me fait, ou tout est pour le mieux, comédie en vaudevilles in 1 act, (posthumous)

== Bibliography ==
- Joseph-Marie Quérard, Félix Bourquelot, Charles Louandre, La littérature française contemporaine. XIXe siècle, 1857, p. 506-507
- Philippe Chauveau, Les théâtres parisiens disparus: 1402-1986, 1999, p. 101, 367
