= Aimé Desprez =

French vaudeville playwright and chansonnier (1783–1824)

- Born: Claude-Aimé Desprez-Saint-Clair; 5 April 1783; Saint-Germain-en-Laye
- Died: 26 April 1824 (aged 41); Herblay
- Occupations: Vaudevilliste, chansonnier

Claude-Aimé Desprez-Saint-Clair (5 April 1783 – 26 April 1824) was a French vaudeville playwright and chansonnier. He himself performed comedy plays and, around 1810, joined the troupe of the Théâtre de l'Ambigu-Comique under the name Saint-Clair.

== Works ==
- Le Foyer ou le Couplet d'annonce, with Varez, vaudeville presented at the Théâtre des Jeunes-Artistes.
- Kikiki, with Brazier and Varez, parody of Tékêli, presented at the Nouveaux-Troubadours.
- Le Mariage de la Valeur, vaudeville, presented at the Ambigu-Comique.
- L'Espoir réalisé, vaudeville, ibid.
- Le Jardin d'Oliviers, ibid.
- Le Mariage sous d'heureux auspices, with Ferrière, vaudeville in 1 act, on the occasion of the marriage of the Duke of Beni, presented at the Ambigu-Comique, Paris, 1816, in-8°.
- Marguerite de Straffort, ou le Retour à la royauté, with the same, melodrama in 3 acts, in prose, presented on the same stage, Paris, 1816, in-8°.
- Retournons à Paris, with Varez, comedy in 1 act mingled with vaudevilles, presented on the same stage, Paris, 1817, in-8°.
- Grégoire à Tunis, with Ferrière, vaudeville presented at the Ambigu-Comique.
- Monsieur de la Hure, vaudeville given at the Théâtre de la Gaîté.
- L'Homme à tout, with an anonymous author, vaudeville, Théâtre de la Gaîté.
- Les Épaulettes de grenadier, with Edmond, comedy in 1 act, mingled with vaudevilles, Théâtre de la Porte-Saint-Martin, Paris, 1820, in-8°.
- Paris, with Edmond, Crosnier and Émile de Plugette, impromptu mingled with couplets, on the occasion of the birth of his Royal Highness the Duke of Bordeaux, Théâtre de la Porte-Saint-Martin, 29 September 1820, Paris, 1820, in-8°.
- Le Bouffon dans l'embarras, with Ferrière, vaudeville, Théâtre des Variétés.
- Les Ermites, with Edmond Crosnier and Michel-Nicolas Balisson de Rougemont, comédie en vaudevilles in 1 act, Théâtre de la Porte-Saint-Martin, Paris, 1821, in-8°.
- Le Protégé de tout le monde, with J. Dusaulchoy and Alexandre-Joseph Le Roy de Bacre, comédie en vaudevilles in 1 act, Théâtre de la Porte-Saint-Martin, 12 November 1822, Paris, 1822, in-8°.
- Le Mariage à la turque, vaudeville in 1 act, Paris, 1823, in-8°.
- Malbrouck, folie-vaudeville.
- La Grotte de Fingal, ou le Soldat mystérieux.
