= Victor Henri Joseph Brahain Ducange =

French novelist and dramatist

Victor Henri-Joseph Brahain du Cange (or Ducange) (November 24, 1783 – October 15, 1833) was a French novelist and dramatist, born at the Hague, where his father was secretary to the French embassy.

Dismissed from the civil service at the Restoration, Ducange became one of the favorite authors of the liberal party, and owed some part of his popularity to the fact that he was fined and imprisoned more than once for his outspokenness. He was six months in prison for an article in his journal Le Diable rose, ou le petit courrier de Lucifer (1822); for Valentine (1821), in which the royalist excesses in the south of France were pilloried, he was again imprisoned; and after the publication of Hélène ou l'amour et la guerre (1823), he took refuge for some time in Belgium.

Ducange wrote numerous plays and melodramas, among which the most successful were Marco Loricot, ou le petit Chouan de 1830(1836), and Trente ans, ou la vie d'un joueur (1827), in which Frédérick Lemaître found one of his best parts. Many of his books were prohibited, ostensibly for their coarseness, but perhaps rather for their political tendencies. He died in Paris.

== Works ==
Theatre

- 1813: Palmerin, ou le Solitaire des Gaules, in three acts
- 1813: Pharamond, ou l’Entrée des Francs dans les Gaules, in three acts
- 1818: Le Prince de Norvège, ou la Bague de fer, in three acts
- 1819: Le Prisonnier vénitien, in three acts, with Dupetit-Méré
- 1819: Calas, in three acts
- 1819: La Tante à marier, one-act comédie en vaudeville
- 1819: La Maison du Corrégidor, ou Ruse et malice, in three acts
- 1820: Le Colonel et le Soldat, in three acts
- 1820: Thérèse, ou l’Orpheline de Genève, in three acts
- 1821: La Suédoise, in three acts
- 1822: Élodie, ou la Vierge du monastère, in three acts
- 1823: Lisbeth, in three acts
- 1824: Les Diamants, in three acts
- 1826: Mac Doivell, in three acts
- 1826: Trente ans, ou la Vie d’un joueur
- 1828: Polder, ou le Bourreau d’Amsterdam, with Pixérécourt, in three acts
- 1828: La Fiancée de Lammermoor, in three acts
- 1829: Sept heures ou Charlotte Corday, three-act melodrama with Auguste Anicet-Bourgeois, Théâtre de la Porte-Saint-Martin
- 1830: Le Jésuite, with Pixérécourt, en trois actes
- 1831: La Vendetta, ou la Fiancée corse, in three acts
- 1831: Il y a seize ans, in three acts
- 1831: l’Oiseau bleu, with Simonnin, two-act féerie

Novels

- 1819: Agathe, ou le Petit Vieillard de Calais, Paris, 2 vol. in-12°
- 1820: Albert, ou les Amants missionnaires, 2 vol. in-12°
- 1820: Valentine ou le Pasteur d'Uzès, (this work in which he condemned the massacres of 1815, earned him seven months in jail.)
- 1823: Léonide, ou la Vieille de Suresnes, 5 vol. in-12°
- 1825: La Luthérienne, 6 vol. in-12°
- 1825: Le Médecin confesseur, 6 vol. in-12°
- 1826: Les Trois Filles de la Veuve, 6 vol. in-12°
- 1827: L’Artiste et le Soldat, 5 vol, in-12°
- 1830: Isaurine, 5 vol. in-12°
- 1830: Ludovica, 6 vol. in-12°
- 1832: Marc Loricot, 6 vol. in-12°
- 1834: Les Mœurs, tales and short stories, 2 vol. in-12°
- 1835: Joasine, ou la Fille du prêtre, 5 vol, in-12°
