= Antoine Romagnesi =

French composer

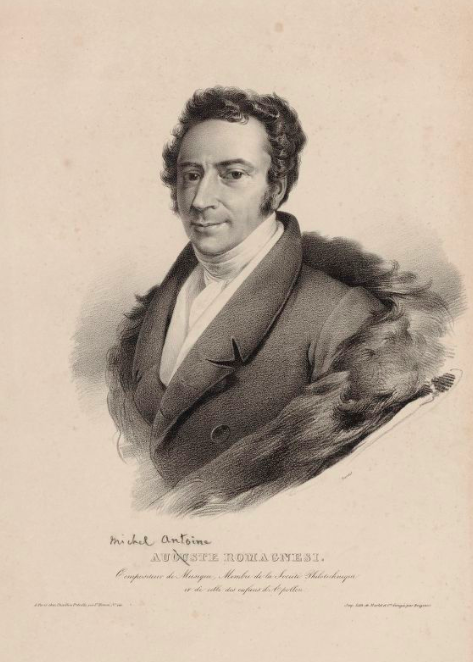
- Born: 1 September 1781; Paris
- Died: 9 January 1850 (aged 68)
- Occupations: Composer, music publisher, music theorician

Antoine Joseph Michel Romagnesi (1 September 1781 – 9 January 1850) was a 19th-century French composer, music publisher and music theorist.

== Life ==
Romagnesi was a pupil of Alexandre-Étienne Choron and Giuseppe Cambini. A soldier, then a clerk for the music publisher Auguste Le Duc in 1806, he became a publisher and music dealer himself in 1828, moving to 8 rue Richelieu in Paris.

He probably was a Freemason

== Works ==
- Nadir et Sélim, three-act opéra comique, first performed at the Théâtre Feydeau in 1822.
- La Guirlande, one-act opéra, composed for the Académie Royale de Musique.

He also composed numerous duets, trios, nocturnes, contredanses and fantasies for piano and more than 200 romances including:

- Le Chien du régiment
- L'Heureuse Destinée (Le Duc, 1825)
- Le Présent et l'Avenir (Chansonnier des Grâces, 1839).

== Publications ==
- Étrennes Musicales, yearly collection.
- Le Troubadour des Salons. Journal de chant avec Accompagnement de Lyre ou Guitare
- L'Abeille musicale. Journal de Chant, composé pour les jeunes personnes, par les auteurs les plus estimés en ce genre. Journal, published between 1828 and 1839.
