= Paul Ledoux =

Belgian astrophysicist (1914–1988)

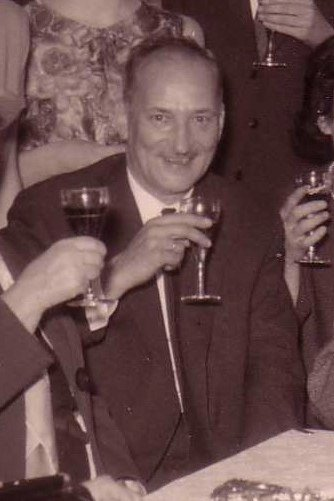
- Paul Ledoux
- Born: 8 August 1914; Forrières, Belgium
- Died: 6 October 1988 (aged 74); Liège, Belgium
- Citizenship: Belgian
- Education: University of Liège
- Known for: Ledoux criterion
- Awards: Francqui Prize (1964); Eddington Medal (1972); Janssen Medal (1976)
- Scientific career
- Fields: Astrophysics
- Workplaces: University of Liège

Paul Ledoux (8 August 1914 – 6 October 1988) was a Belgian astrophysicist best known for his work on stellar stability and variability. With Theodore Walraven, he co-authored a seminal work on stellar oscillations. In 1964 Ledoux was awarded the Francqui Prize for Exact Sciences, and was awarded the Eddington Medal of the Royal Astronomical Society in 1972 for investigations into problems of stellar stability and variable stars. He was awarded the Janssen Medal of the French Academy of Sciences in 1976.

== Ledoux criterion ==
In stellar astrophysics, Ledoux's name is now associated with the criterion under which material in a star becomes unstable to convection in the presence of a gradient of chemical composition. In homogeneous material, the Schwarzschild criterion shows that material is unstable to convection if the radiation field alone would establish a steeper temperature gradient steeper than the adiabatic (or isentropic) temperature gradient. However, Ledoux showed that a composition gradient stabilises or destabilises the material against convection. In convectively-stable regions destabilised by the composition gradient, one expects thermohaline mixing; in convectively-unstable regions that are stabilised, one expects double-diffusive mixing, known in stellar astrophysics as semiconvection.
