= Felice Blangini =

Italian composer (1781–1841)

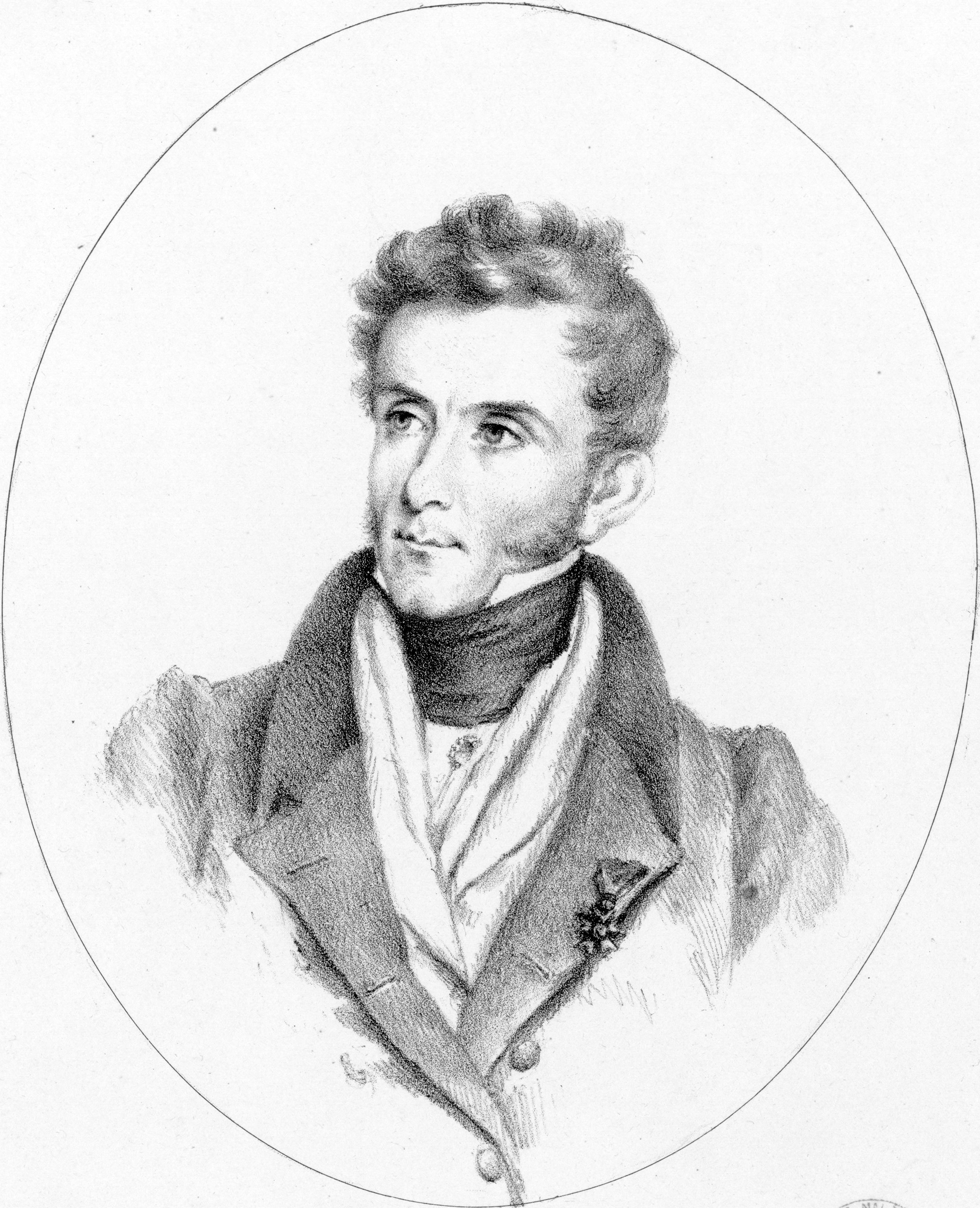
Felice Blangini

Giuseppe Marco Maria Felice Blangini (18 November 1781 – December 1841) was an Italian musical composer.

== Biography ==
Blangini was born in Turin, where, at the age of 12, he became organist of the cathedral. At 14 he led a mass with a full orchestra. He went to Paris in 1799, and was for several years a successful composer of opera there. His fame, however, rests chiefly on his smaller pieces, which were received with much favour, especially in Germany, where he officiated for some time as chapelmaster at the courts of the elector of the Bavarian Electorate of the Palatinate, and of the king of Westphalia. He died in Paris at age 60.

Blangini was among the composers involved in the creation of La marquise de Brinvilliers.
