= Michel-Nicolas Balisson de Rougemont =

French journalist, novelist and dramatist

Michel-Nicolas Balisson
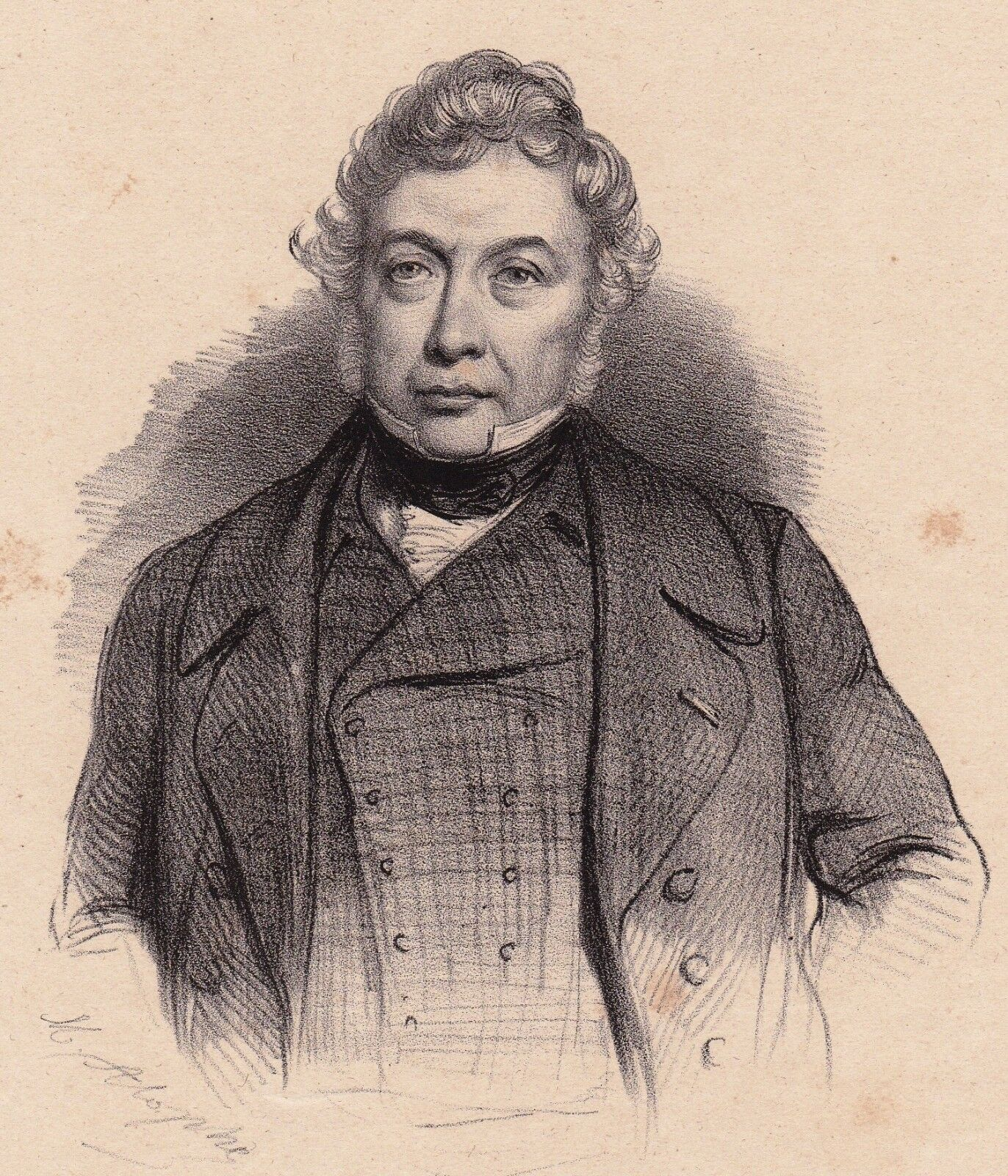
- Michel-Nicolas Balisson de Rougemont
- Born: 27 February 1781; La Rochelle
- Died: 16 July 1840 (aged 59); Paris
- Occupations: Novelist, dramatist

Michel-Nicolas Balisson, baron de Rougemont (27 February 1781 - 16 July 1840), was a French journalist, novelist and dramatist.

== Biography ==
Rougemount's family came from Sourdeval, in Normandy.

He invented the mot de Cambronne.

== Theatre ==
Rougemont has authored numerous plays, alone or in collaboration. the most importants are :

- Chantons et facéties;
- L’lngénue de Brive-la-Gaillarde;
- Mademoiselle Musard;
- 1803 : L’Amour à l’anglaise;
- 1806 : Le Mari supposé;
- 1808 : Monsieur et Madame Denis;
- 1810 : Sophie, ou la Nouvelle Cendrillon;
- 1811 : La Femme innocente, malheureuse et persécutée;
- 1811 : La Rosière de Verneuil;
- 1812 : La Matrimonio-manie;
- 1821 : Le Rôdeur français;
- 1820 : Le Mariage du ci-devant jeune homme;
- 1821 : Les Ermites comédie-vaudeville in 1 act by Edmond Crosnier, Aimé Desprez and Michel-Nicolas Balisson de Rougemont, théâtre de la Porte-Saint-Martin
- 1826 : Pamela, ou la Fille du portier;
- 1827 : La Laitière de Montfermeil;
- 1829 : Le Voile bleu.
- 1831 : La Fille unique;
- 1832 : Jeanne Vaubernier, ou la Cour de Louis XV;
- 1834 : Salvoisy, ou l’Amoureux de la reine;
- 1835 : Madelon Friquet;
- 1835 : La Croix d'or by Charles Dupeuty and Michel-Nicolas Balisson de Rougemont, Théâtre du Palais Royal
- 1836 : Léon, drama in 5 acts, théâtre de la Porte-Saint-Martin, 1 December
- 1837 : Les Amants valets;
- 1838 : La Reine des blanchisseuses;
- 1839 : La Belle Bourbonnaise;

== Sources ==
- Antoine Alexandre Barbier, Joseph Marie Quérard, Dictionnaire des ouvrages anonymes, Paris, Féchoz et Letouzey, 1882, (p. 438).
