= Marc-Antoine Désaugiers =

French composer (1742–1793)

Marc-Antoine Désaugiers (1742 – 10 September 1793) was a French composer of numerous operas as well as a cantata on the storming of the Bastille and several pieces of sacred music. He was born in Fréjus. He studied music there but was largely an autodidact. Désaugiers settled in Paris in 1774 where he first came to prominence with his French translation of Giovanni Battista Mancini's Pensieri e riflessioni pratiche sopra il canto figurato. His translation, published in 1776 under the title L'Art du chant figuré, was much admired by Gluck who became his close friend. Désaugiers died in Paris. His son, Marc-Antoine Madeleine Désaugiers was also a composer.
