= Bertin (disambiguation) =

Bertin (c. 615 – c. 709) was the Frankish abbot of a monastery in Saint-Omer who is venerated as a saint by the Catholic and Orthodox Churches.

Bertin may also refer to:

== People ==
- Alexis Bertin (born 1980), French footballer
- Claude Bertin (fl. 1687–1705), French sculptor
- Edouard François Bertin (1797–1871), French painter, son of Louis-François
- Françoise Bertin (1925–2014), French actress
- Frantz Bertin a.k.a. Bertin (born 1983), Haitian footballer
- Gabby Bertin, Baroness Bertin (born 1978), British Conservative member of the House of Lords
- Guy Bertin (born 1954), Grand Prix motorcycle road racer from France
- Henri Bertin (1720–1792), French minister of foreign affairs
- Jacques Bertin (1918–2010), French cartographer
- Jean-Victor Bertin (1767–1842), French painter
- Joanne Bertin (born 1953), American science fiction/fantasy novelist
- Jean Bertin (1917–1975), French scientist, engineer and inventor
- Kevin Bertin (born 1990), American drag queen known as Monét X Change
- Léon Bertin (1896-1956), French zoologist
- Louise Angelique Bertin (1805–1877), French composer and poet, daughter of Louis-François
- Louis-Émile Bertin (1840–1924), French naval engineer
- Louis-François Bertin (1766–1841), French journalist
- Louis-François Bertin de Vaux (1771–1842), brother of the above
- Nicolas Bertin (1667-1736), French painter of Biblical and mythological scenes
- René-Joseph-Hyacinthe Bertin (1757–1828), French anatomist known for his pioneering work in cardiology
- Rose Bertin (1747–1813), French milliner and dressmaker to Queen Marie Antoinette
- Ryan Bertin (born 1981), American amateur wrestler
- Teddy Bertin (born 1969), French footballer
- Théodore-Pierre Bertin (1751–1819), French author
- Willy Bertin (born 1944), Italian ski mountaineer and biathlete
- Yvon Bertin (born 1953), French road bicycle racer

== Ships ==
- French cruiser Émile Bertin

== See also ==
- Annals of St Bertin
- Abbey of Saint Bertin
