= Feuilleton =

Newspaper section

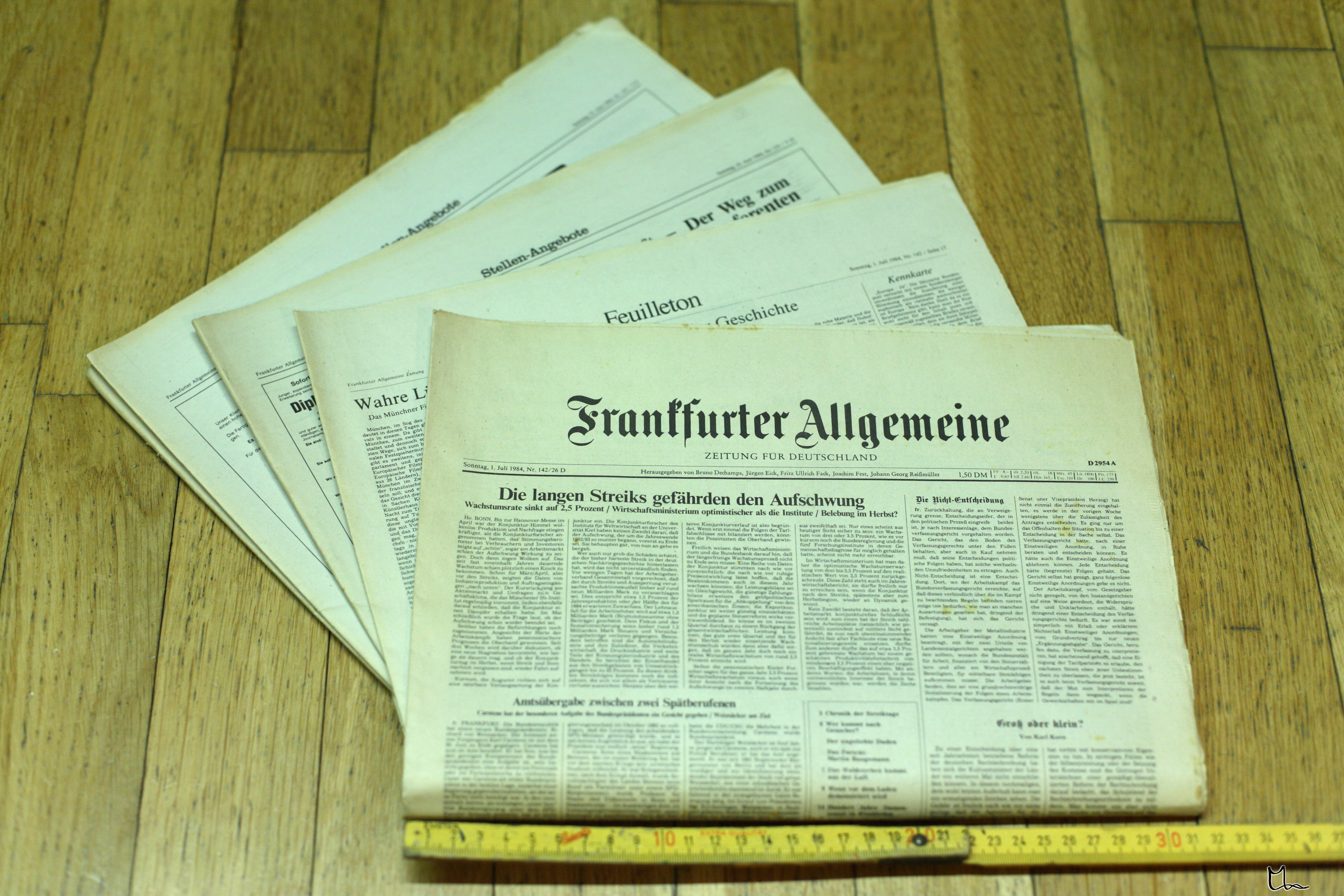
July 1, 1984 edition of the Frankfurter Allgemeine Zeitung. The second section is the feuilleton.

A feuilleton (French pronunciation: [fœjtɔ̃]; a diminutive of French: feuillet, the leaf of a book) was originally a kind of supplement attached to the political portion of French newspapers, consisting chiefly of non-political news and gossip, literature and art criticism, a chronicle of the latest fashions, and epigrams, charades, and other literary trifles. It remains a widely popular newspaper supplement in Germany, Austria, and in German-speaking Switzerland.

The term feuilleton was invented in 1800 for the publishing format by the editors of the French Journal des débats, Julien Louis Geoffroy and Bertin the Elder. Early on, the feuilleton was described as a "talk of the town". A contemporary English-language example of the format is the section of The New Yorker that is entitled, "Talk of the Town". However, in English newspapers, the term instead came to refer to an installment of a serial story that is printed in one part of a newspaper.

== History ==
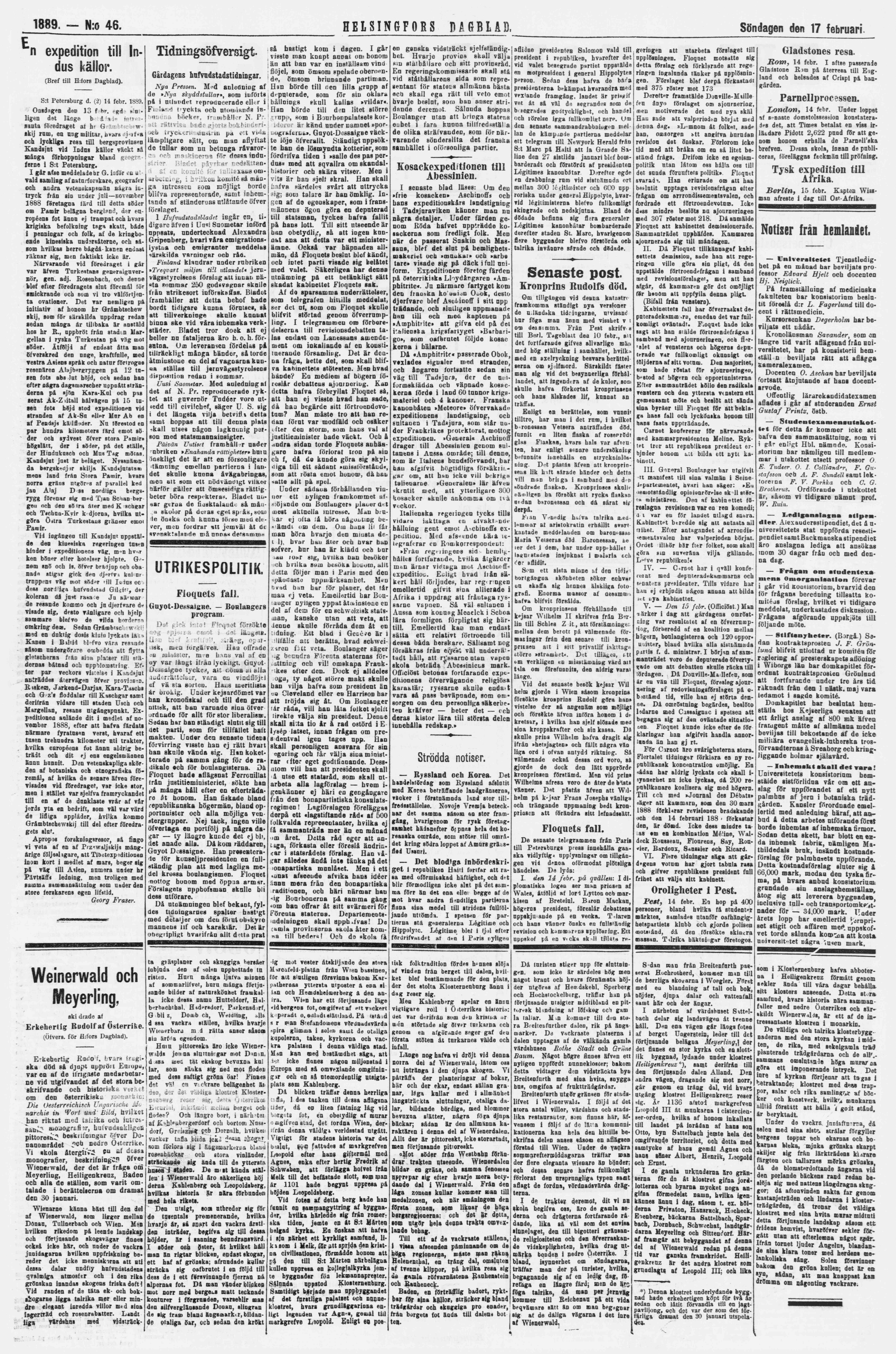
A page from the Finnish newspaper Helsingfors Dagblad (1889), showing a "ground floor" feuilleton

The feuilleton was the literary consequence of the Coup of 18 Brumaire (Dix-huit-Brumaire). A consular edict of January 17, 1800, made a clean sweep of the revolutionary press, and cut down the number of Paris newspapers to 13. Under the Consulate, and later on, the Empire, Le Moniteur Universel, which served as a propaganda mouthpiece for Napoleon Bonaparte, basically controlled what the other twelve Parisian publications could run. Julien Louis Geoffroy found that what might not be written in an editorial column could appear with perfect impunity on a lower level on the rez-de-chaussée, the "ground floor" of a journal. Geoffroy started the first feuilleton in the Journal des Débats. The idea caught on at once. The feuilleton, which dealt ostensibly with literature, the drama, and other harmless topics, but which, nevertheless, could make political capital out of the failure of a book or a play, became quite powerful under the Napoleonic nose. The original feuilletons were not usually printed on a separate sheet, but merely separated from the political part of the newspaper by a line and printed in smaller type on the bottom of same sheet of the newspaper where the political story appeared.

Geoffroy's own feuilleton dealt with the theatre as he was a trenchant drama critic. By the time of his death in 1814, several other feuilletonists had made their mark, with Janin taking over from him. Feuilletonists featured in other papers included Théophile Gautier, Paul de St. Victor, Edmond de Biéville, Louis Ulbach, and Francisque Sarcey, who occupied the "ground floor" of the Temps. Adolphe Adam, Hector Berlioz, and Coutil-Blaze wrote music-laden feuilletons. Babinet, Louis Figuier, and Meunier focused on science. Bibliographical feuilletons were authored by Armand de Pontmartin, Gustave Planche, and Charles Augustin Sainte-Beuve.

However, the feuilleton would become a phenomenon only with the appearance of serialised novels. For instance, those of Alexandre Dumas, The Count of Monte Cristo, The Three Musketeers, and Vingt ans après, all filled the "ground floors" of the Siècle. Eugène Sue's Mystères de Paris ran in the Débate, and his Juif Errant (The Wandering Jew) appeared in the Constitutionnel. In The World of Yesterday, Stefan Zweig wrote of how the feuilleton by Neue Freie Presse, "in the lower half of the front page, separated sharply from the ephemera of politics and the day by an unbroken line that extended from margin to margin", had become the leading arbiter of literary culture in fin de siècle Vienna, such that a feuilleton writer's "yes or no... decided the success of a work, a play, or a book, and with it that of the author".

The feuilleton was a common genre in Russia, especially during the government reforms of Alexander II (1855–1881). Fyodor Dostoevsky wrote feuilletons. The feuilletonistic tendency of his work has been explored by Zhernokleyev. By 1870, Dostoevsky parodied the feuilleton for its celebration of ephemeral culture.

The Swiss author Robert Walser earned income by publishing many feuilletons in periodicals from around 1899 to around 1920. Many of these short pieces have been re-published in English-language collections in the 2000's and 2010's, for example in A Schoolboy's Diary and Berlin Stories.

=== Evolving etymology ===
In the United States during the twentieth century, S. J. Perelman described his comic works, usually reports of his own misadventures, as feuilletons and he defined himself as a feuilletoniste. In 2000, Marcy Wheeler used the term to identify a literary-journalistic essay form that often is self-published and that is published to express opinions that might ordinarily be censored due to government displeasure.

== See also ==
- Causerie
- Op-ed
- Column
- The Third Culture (1995), book that inspired several German newspapers to integrate scientific reports into their feuilleton sections
- Terza pagina
- Serial novel
- Sunday Supplement
- Xiaopin
