= Louis-François Bertin =

French journalist (1766–1841)

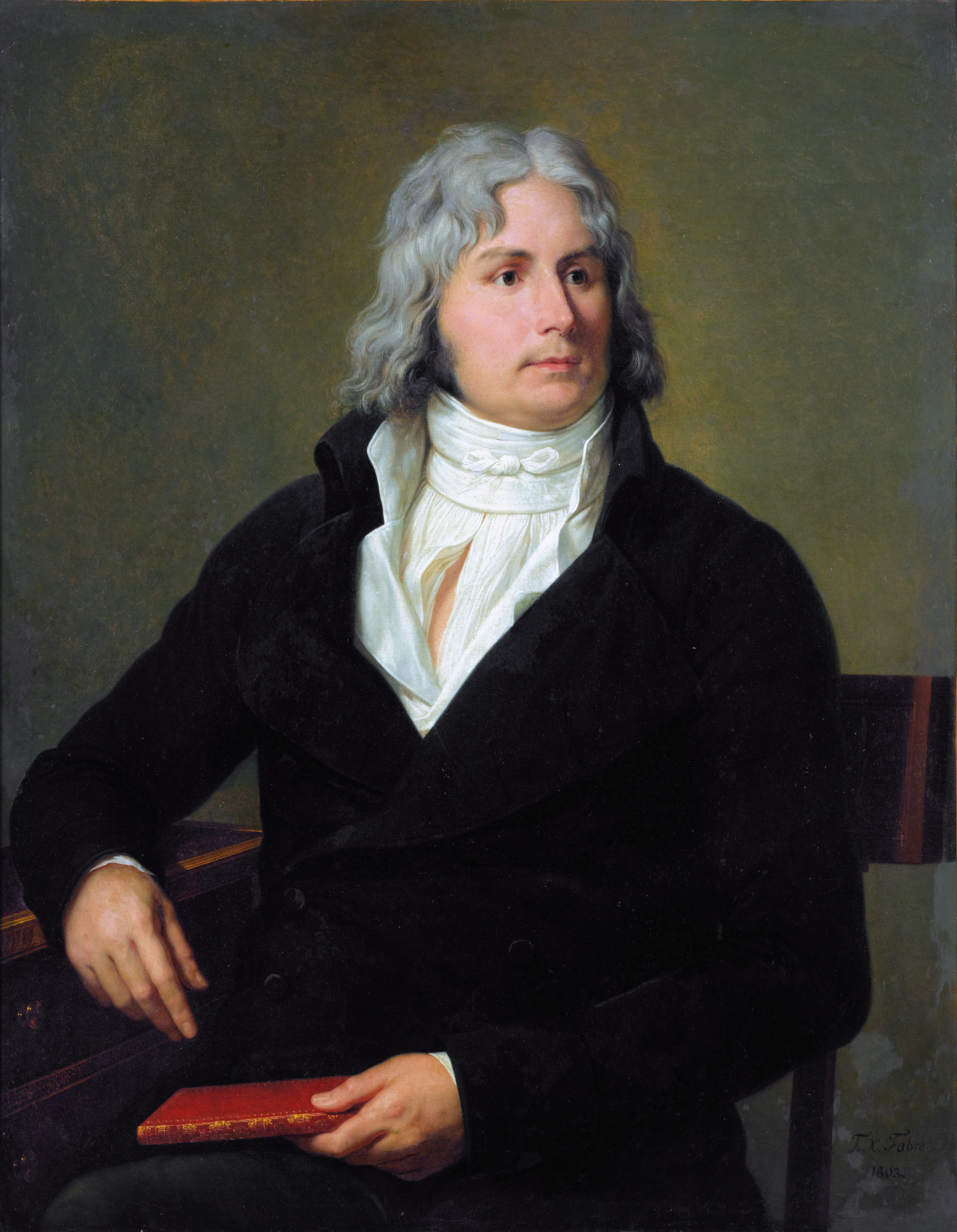
Louis-François Bertin (François-Xavier Fabre, 1803)

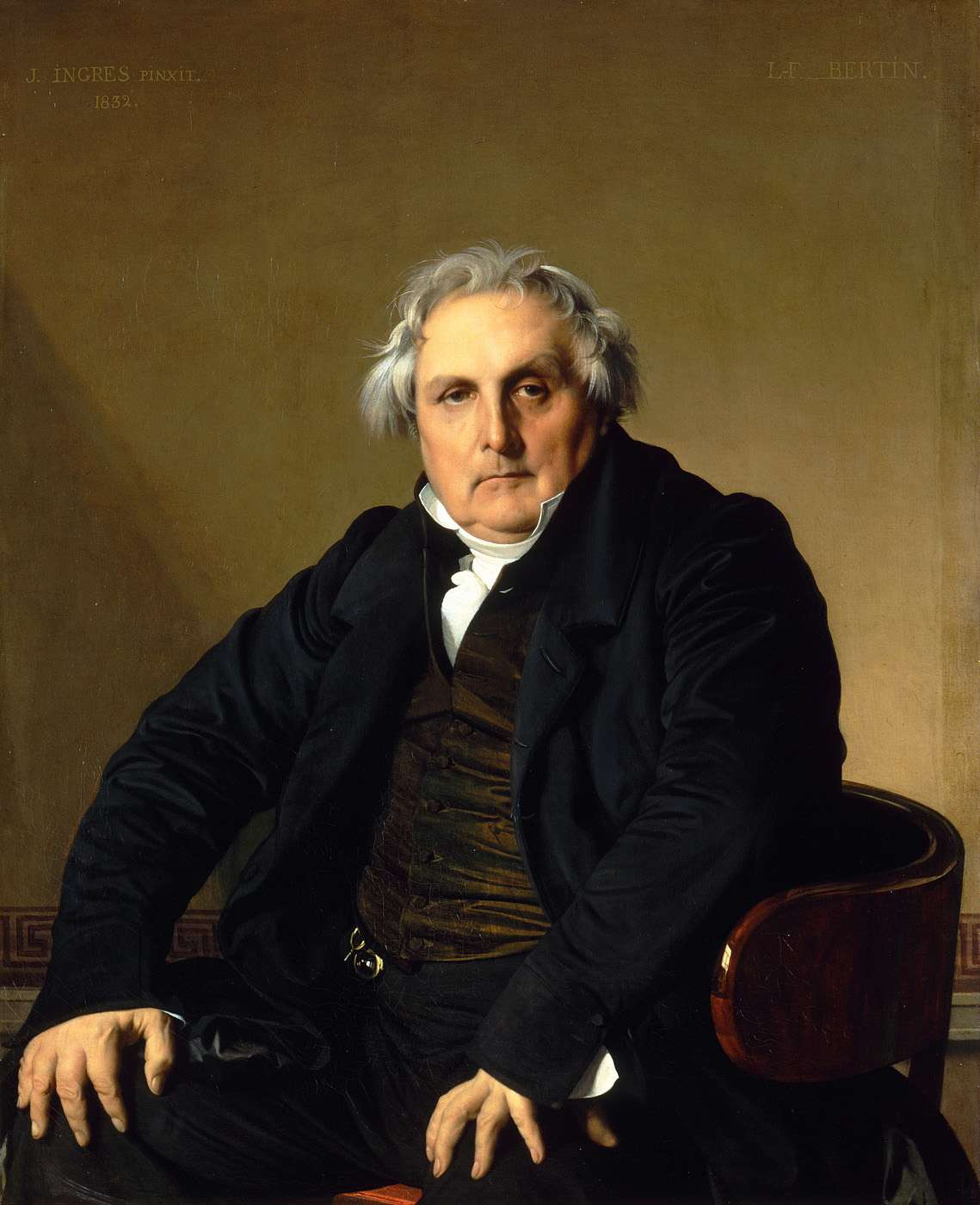
Portrait of Louis-François Bertin (Jean Auguste Dominique Ingres, 1832)

Louis-François Bertin (French pronunciation: [lwi fʁɑ̃swa bɛʁtɛ̃]), also known as Bertin l'Aîné ([bɛʁtɛ̃ lɛne], Bertin the Elder; 14 December 1766 – 13 September 1841), was a French journalist. He had a younger brother, Louis-François Bertin de Vaux; two sons, Edouard François and Louis-Marie François; and a daughter, Louise Bertin.

== Life ==
=== Early career ===
Born in Paris (his father was a former secretary of Étienne François, duc de Choiseul), and considered in retrospect the most important member of the Bertin family, he began his journalistic career by writing for the Journal Français and other papers during the French Revolution. After Napoleon Bonaparte's 18 Brumaire Coup he acquired the paper with his family name has chiefly been connected, the Journal des débats. Guided by the contributions of figures such as Joseph Fiévée, Julien Louis Geoffroy, François-René de Chateaubriand, Charles-Marie-Dorimond de Féletz, Jean François Boissonade de Fontarabie, Conrad Malte-Brun, François Benoît Hoffmann, and Charles Nodier, the Journal soon became a major authority in French press and literature. Bertin is credited with the invention of the feuilleton, a supplement to a newspaper's political section, usually in smaller type, that carries gossip, fashion, criticism, epigrams and charades, and fosters a culture of literary gamesmanship.

Suspected of royalist tendencies by the French Consulate, Bertin was imprisoned at the Temple in 1800, and exiled in 1801. He returned to Paris in 1805 after the proclamation of the Empire, and resumed management of the paper, the title of which had been changed by order of Napoleon to Journal de l'Empire. He had to submit to rigorous censorship, and in 1811 the publication, and its profits, were taken over entirely by the government.

=== Restoration and July Monarchy ===
In 1814 Bertin regained possession of the paper, restored its old title, and continued his support of the royalist cause during the Hundred Days, joining Louis XVIII in the Southern Netherlands, where he edited the Moniteur Universel as Moniteur de Gand.

During the full Bourbon Restoration, Bertin directed the Moniteur until 1823, when the Journal des débats became the recognized organ of the liberal-constitutional opposition after he had come to criticize absolutism (a road similar to the one taken by Chateaubriand). After 1830, however, Bertin supported the July Monarchy. He died in Paris in 1841.

Ingres's 1832 portrait of Bertin, first exhibited at the 1833 Paris Salon, is one of his most famous works.
