= Charles-Victor Prévot, vicomte d'Arlincourt =

French novelist (1788–1856)

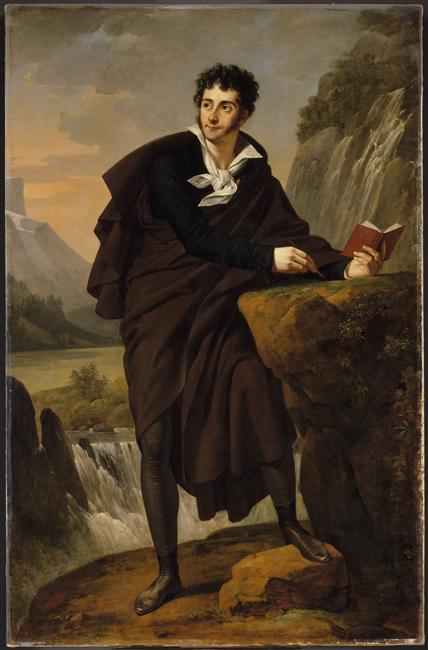
Charles-Victor Prévot, vicomte d'Arlincourt by Robert Lefèvre, 1822

Charles-Victor Prévot, vicomte d'Arlincourt (English: /ˈprɛvoʊ/ PRE-voh, French: [ʃaʁl viktɔʁ pʁevo]; 26 September 1788 — 22 January 1856) was a French novelist, born at the Château de Mérantais, Magny-les-Hameaux, Yvelines.

In the 1820s, the popularity of this author, upon whom was bestowed the epithet "the prince of the romantics", rivalled that of Victor Hugo.

His father Louis-Adrien Prévost d'Arlincourt was guillotined on 8 May 1794, along with Antoine Lavoisier and 26 other farmers-general. At the beginning of the First Empire, his mother pleaded his cause before Napoleon, who decided to name him écuyer ("squire") to Madame Mère. At the age of 29, he married the daughter of a senator, and composed a tragedy, Charlemagne, which was declined by the Théâtre-Français. In 1811 Napoleon appointed him as a master (auditeur) at the Council of State, then as an intendant in the Spanish army. He participated in the Spanish campaign and was present at the capture of Tarragona.

After the fall of Napoleon, he succeeded in ingratiating himself with Louis XVIII, who named him Master of Requests. He bought a chateau and adopted the title of viscount. In 1818, he orchestrated a huge publicity campaign for the publication of his epic poem, Charlemagne, ou la Caroléide, and presented himself before the Academy, where his candidature obtained exactly one vote. Undiscouraged, he began work on a novel which he believed would bring him as great a reputation as Chateaubriand's.

Le Solitaire appeared in 1821 and achieved an "extraordinary, even colossal, celebrity." In the space of several months, the book was reprinted a dozen times; it was translated into ten languages; there were no fewer than seven operas based on its story, and twice as many dramatic adaptations; and it was the subject of innumerable songs, parodies, paintings and lithographs. The success of his next three novels, Le Renégat in 1822, Ipsiboé in 1823, and L'Étrangère in 1825, was almost as great.

Adulated above all by his female readership, who saw him as "the new Ossian", he was harpooned by critics. His plot points were judged impossible, his characters cardboard, and his imagery grotesque. His taste for syntactic inversions, with which he generously adorned his prose, led to the nickname "the inversive Viscount", and the result was memorably parodied in Illusions perdues by Balzac (who, nevertheless, was strongly influenced in his first works by the gothic style of d'Arlincourt). The Academic Charles-Marie de Féletz wrote that "Le Solitaire has so far been translated into every single known language, except of course French." Later assessments were no more favourable. His novels, now classified as "gothic", were then labelled frénétique: "containing a mysterious intrigue centred on some illustrious and guilty wretch who traipses through a thousand violent incidents towards a bloody catastrophe."

D'Arlincourt's vanity and egocentricity were the subject of many anecdotes, including a story of his attempts to persuade his portrait-painter, Robert Lefèvre, to make his eyes look larger and larger, until they were "like those of an ox"; the result was still considered unsatisfactory by his wife, who confronted the painter, turning to her husband and telling him to "Do that thing with your eyes." (Mon ami, fais tes yeux.) He also posed for Jean-Baptiste Isabey.

D'Arlincourt frequently defended himself in print, explaining that it was his goal to "spiritualize all the impressions of existence"; he presented a play he wrote in his youth, Le Siège de Paris, at the Théâtre-Français in 1826, but it was promptly torn to pieces by the critics. Not always justly: some of the most ridiculed extracts are not in fact by him.

He made two long journeys through Europe, in 1841 and 1844, visiting exiled princes, and on his return presented a new play, La Peste noire, which was received no more favourably than the first. In 1848, outraged by the events of June, he published Dieu le veut! ("God wills it!"), a pamphlet which led to legal troubles for the author but also increased his popularity. In 1850 he published L'Italie rouge, a hostile account of the Risorgimento. In the last years of his life, still "avid for acclaim", he was a frequent guest of salons.

== Works ==
Novels

- Une Matinée de Charlemagne, fragmens tirés d'un poëme épique qui ne tardera point à paraître (1810)
- Charlemagne, ou La Caroléide, poème épique en vingt-quatre chants (1818). Text 1 2
- Le Solitaire (2 volumes, 1821). Réédition : Slatkine, Genève, 1973. Text 1 2
- Le Renégat (2 volumes, 1822). Text 1 2
- Ipsiboé (2 volumes, 1823)
- L'Étrangère (2 volumes, 1825)
- Ismalie, ou la Mort et l'amour, roman-poëme (2 volumes, 1828)
- Le Chef des Penitens noirs, ou le Proscrit et l'Inquisition (5 volumes, 1828)
- Les Rebelles sous Charles V (3 volumes, 1832)
- Les Écorcheurs, ou l'Usurpation et la peste, fragmens historiques, 1418 (1833)
- Le Brasseur roi, chronique flamande du quatorzième siècle (2 volumes, 1834)
- Double Règne, chronique du treizième siècle (2 volumes, 1835)
- L'Herbagère (2 volumes, 1837)
- Les Trois Châteaux, histoire contemporaine (2 volumes, 1840)
- Ida et Nathalie (2 volumes, 1841)
- Les Anneaux d'une chaîne (2 volumes, 1845)
- Les Fiancés de la mort, histoire contemporaine (1850)
- La Tache de sang (5 volumes, 1851)
- Le Château de Chaumont (1851)

Plays

- Le Siège de Paris, tragédie en 5 actes, Paris, Théâtre-Français, 8 avril 1826.
- La Peste noire, ou Paris en 1334, drame en 5 actes et 7 tableaux dont 1 prologue, Paris, Théâtre de l'Ambigu-Comique, 7 avril 1845.

Other works

- Le Pèlerin. L'Étoile polaire (2 volumes, 1843)
- Les Trois Royaumes (1844)
- L'Italie rouge, ou Histoire des révolutions de Rome, Naples, Palerme, Messine, Florence, Parme, Modène, Turin, Milan, Venise, depuis l'avènement du pape Pie IX, en juin 1846, jusqu'à sa rentrée dans sa capitale, en avril 1850 (1850)

Pamphlets

- Dieu le veut ! (1848)
- Suite à Dieu le veut, par le Vte d'Arlincourt. Place au droit. Première partie. La Révolution et l'Élysée. Seconde partie. La Royauté et Frohsdorf (1850)
