= Portrait of Baldassare Castiglione =

Painting by Raphael

- Artist: Raphael
- Year: c. 1514–1515
- Medium: Oil on canvas
- Dimensions: 82 cm × 67 cm (32 in × 26 in)
- Location: Louvre, Paris
- Accession: INV 611

Portrait of Baldassare Castiglione is a c. 1514–1515 oil painting attributed to the Italian High Renaissance painter Raphael. Considered one of the great portraits of the Renaissance, it has an enduring influence. It depicts Raphael's friend, the diplomat and humanist Baldassare Castiglione, who is considered a quintessential example of the High Renaissance gentleman.

== Overview ==
The portrait was produced as a result of Raphael's friendship with Castiglione, whose ascent in courtly circles paralleled that of the artist. They were close friends by 1504, when Castiglione made his second visit to Urbino, as Raphael was gaining recognition as an artist in the humanist circle of the city's ducal court. Raphael was commissioned by Guidobaldo da Montefeltro in 1505 to paint a picture for Henry VII; Castiglione traveled to England to present the finished painting to the king. It is possible that Castiglione later served as a "scholarly advisor" for Raphael's The School of Athens, and that the depiction of Zoroaster in that fresco may be a portrait of the courtier.

Portrait of Baldassare Castiglione may have had a practical and intimate purpose. Castiglione left his family behind when he went to Rome, and he wrote a poem in which he imagined his wife and son consoling themselves with the picture during his absence.

The composition is pyramidal. It's one of only two Raphael's paintings on canvas (it was considered before as originally painted on a wood panel, and later transferred to canvas). Copies produced in the 17th century show Castiglione's hands in full, suggesting that the picture was subsequently cut by several inches at the bottom (at a later date researchers determined it has not been cut). Castiglione is seated against an earth-toned background and wears a dark doublet with a trim of squirrel fur and black ribbon; on his head is a turban topped by a notched beret. The attire indicates that this was painted during the winter, likely that of 1514–1515, when Castiglione was in Rome by appointment of Guidobaldo da Montefeltro to Pope Leo X. The lightest areas are the subject's face seen nearly head-on, a billow of white shirt front at his chest, and his folded hands, which are mostly cropped at the bottom edge of the canvas. Castiglione is seen as vulnerable, possessing a humane sensitivity characteristic of Raphael's later portraits. The soft contours of his clothing and rounded beard express the subtlety of the subject's personality. In his The Book of the Courtier Castiglione argued on behalf of the cultivation of fine manners and dress. He popularized the term sprezzatura, which translates roughly to "nonchalant mastery", an ideal of effortless grace befitting a man of culture. The concept eventually found its way into English literature, in the plays of Ben Jonson and William Shakespeare.

The picture's elegance of execution is consistent with the attitude of the subject. Art historian Lawrence Gowing noted the counter-intuitive handling of gray velvet (actually a fur) as contrary to an academic modeling of form, with the broad surfaces banked in rich darkness and the fabric shining most brightly as it turns away from the light. For Gowing, "The picture has the subtlety of baroque observation but the stillness and noble contour of classic painting at its peak." The portrait's composition and atmospheric quality suggest an homage to the Mona Lisa, which Raphael would have seen in Rome. Yet the Castiglione portrait transcends questions of influence; art historian James Beck wrote that "The Portrait of Baldassare Castiglione stands as a final solution for single male portraiture within the Renaissance style...."

Notwithstanding shifts in the critical appraisal of Raphael's work, the painting has enjoyed consistent admiration from other artists. Titian was strongly influenced by this portrait, and may have first viewed it in Castiglione's home in Mantua. The Venetian master's Portrait of a Man (Tommaso Mosti?) is generally seen as owing a strong compositional debt to Raphael's painting, and also reflects Castiglione's influential advice regarding the restrained elegance of attire recommended for courtiers. In 1639 Rembrandt drew a sketch of the painting while it was being auctioned in Amsterdam, and subsequently referenced the composition in several self-portraits. A copy of the painting, now in the Courtauld Institute of Art, was painted by Peter Paul Rubens. Both Rembrandt's and Rubens's versions display Baroque flourish, quite different from the original painting's sober restraint. In the 19th century Jean Auguste Dominique Ingres chose a frame for his Portrait of Monsieur Bertin much like that which adorned Raphael's painting, perhaps indicating Ingres's ambitions, while also underscoring the paintings' similarities of coloration and extraordinary illusionism. At the turn of the 20th century Henri Matisse copied the painting, and Paul Cézanne exclaimed of Raphael's portrait: "How well rounded the forehead is, with all the distinct planes. How well balanced the patches in the unity of the whole...."

Now in the Louvre, the painting was acquired by Louis XIV in 1661 from the heirs of Cardinal Mazarin.

== Influenced paintings ==
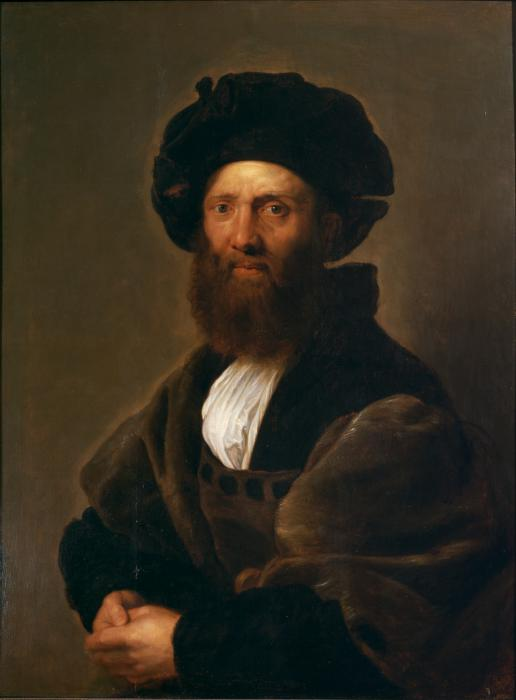
Rubens, Portrait of Baldassare Castiglione, 1630.

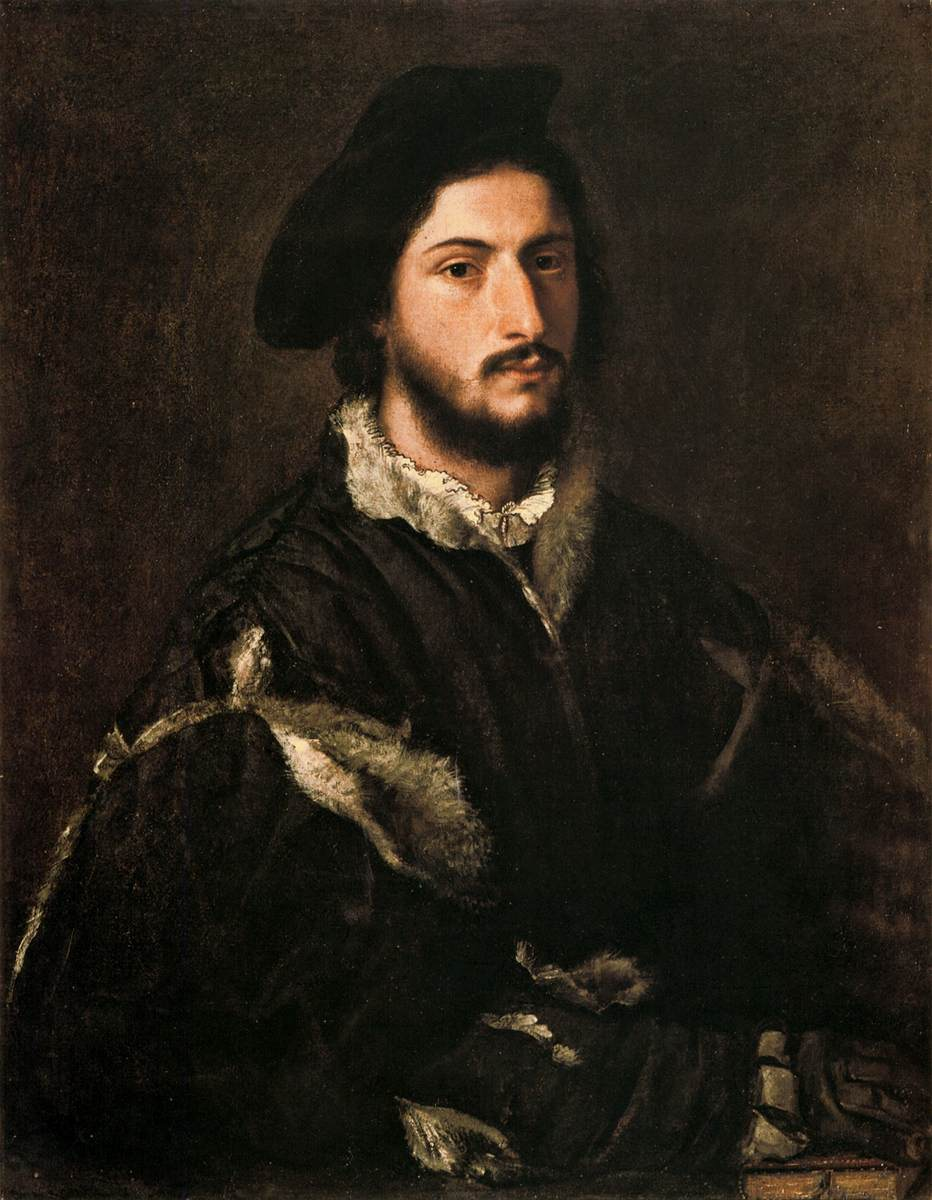
Titian, Portrait of a Man (Tommaso Mosti?), ca. 1520.

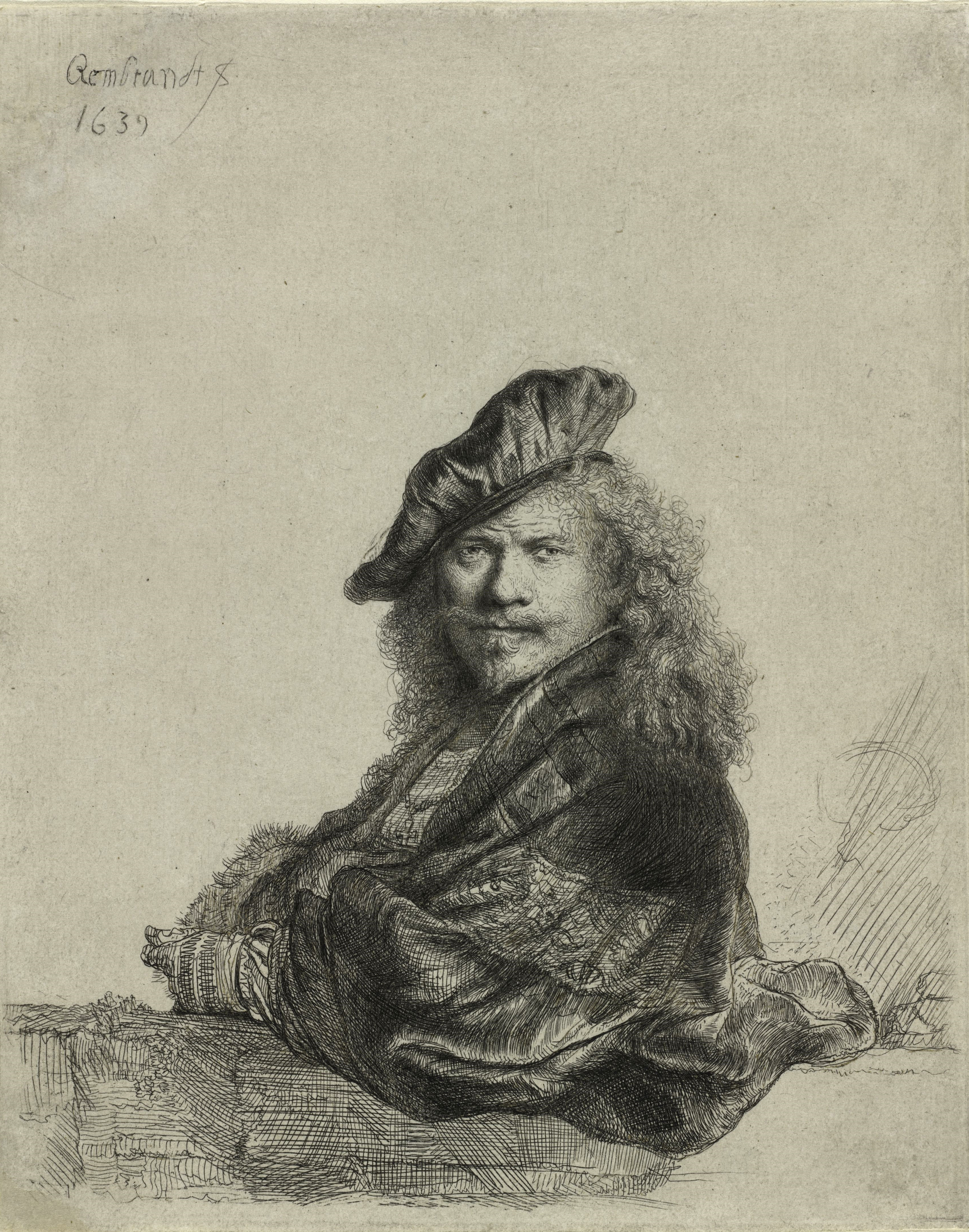
Rembrandt, Self-portrait Leaning on a Stone Sill, etching, 1639.

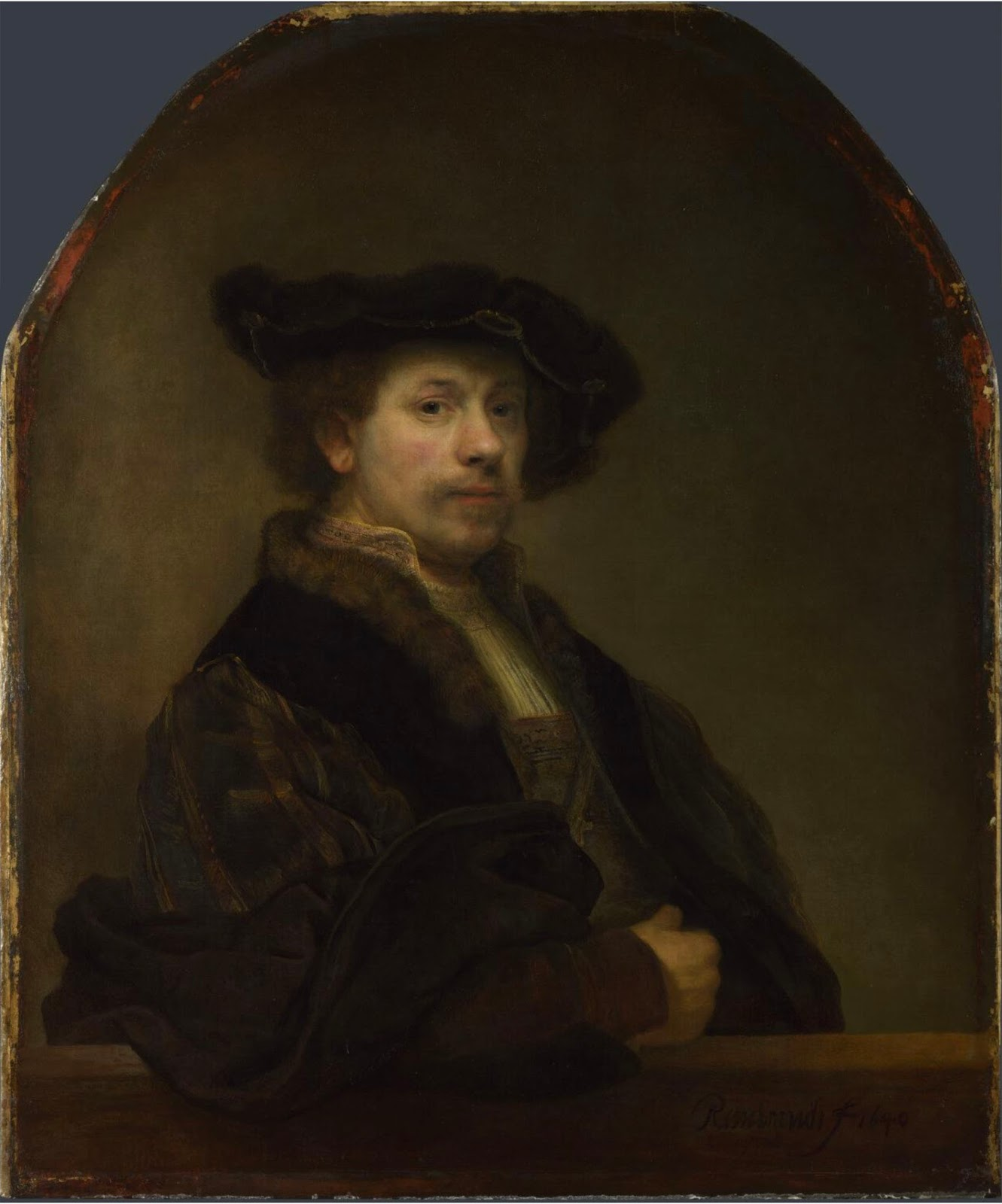
Rembrandt, Self Portrait, 1640.

Rembrandt, Self Portrait with Beret and Turned-Up Collar, 1659. A later self-portrait by Rembrandt showing the influence of the Castiglione portrait.

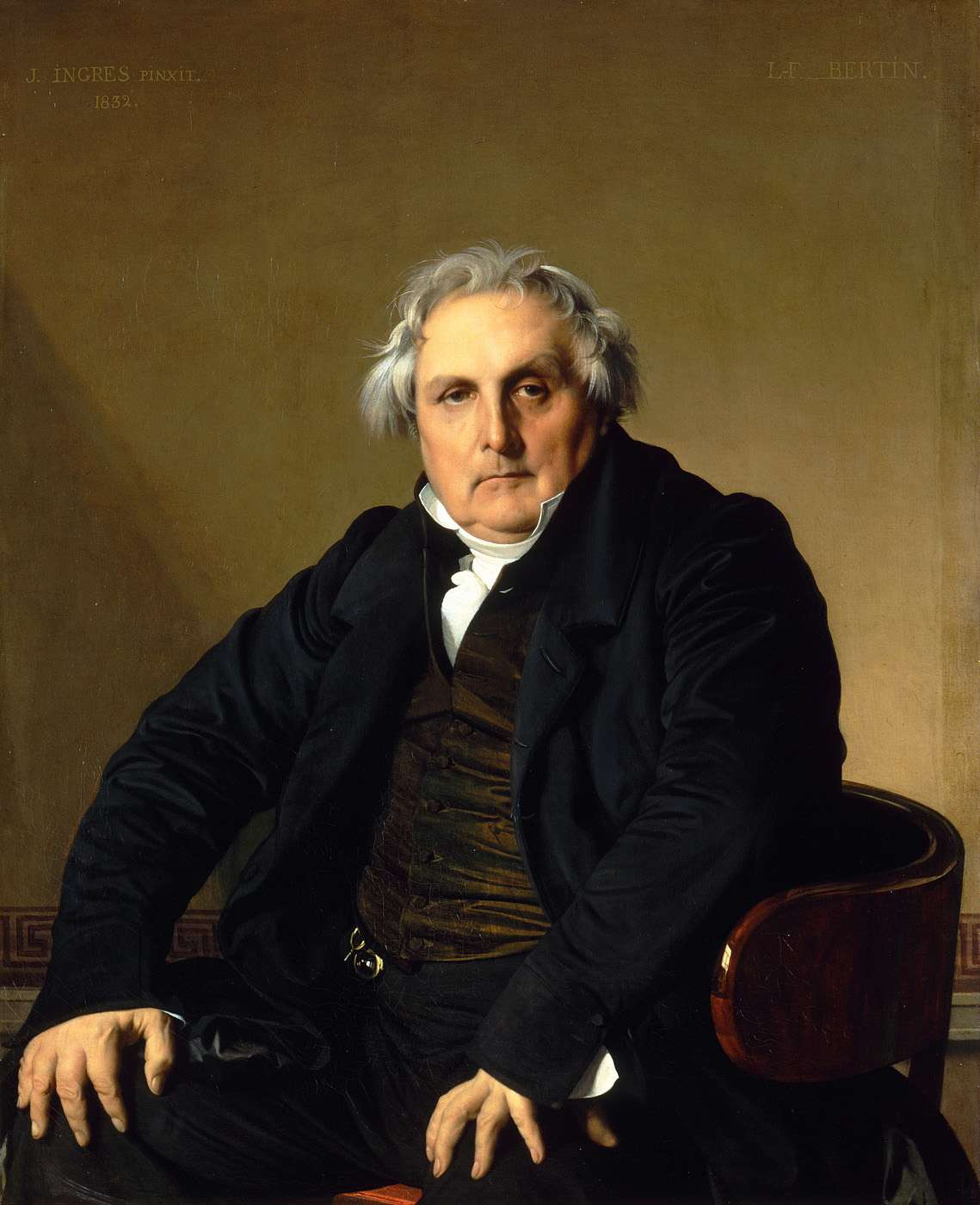
Jean Auguste Dominique Ingres, Portrait of Monsieur Bertin, 1832.

== On screen ==
Portrait de l'ami en homme de cour. Portrait de Balthazar Castiglione, film by Alain Jaubert from Palettes series (1994).

== See also ==
- List of paintings by Raphael
