= Madame Sorgue =

French anarcho-syndicalist feminist (1864–1924)

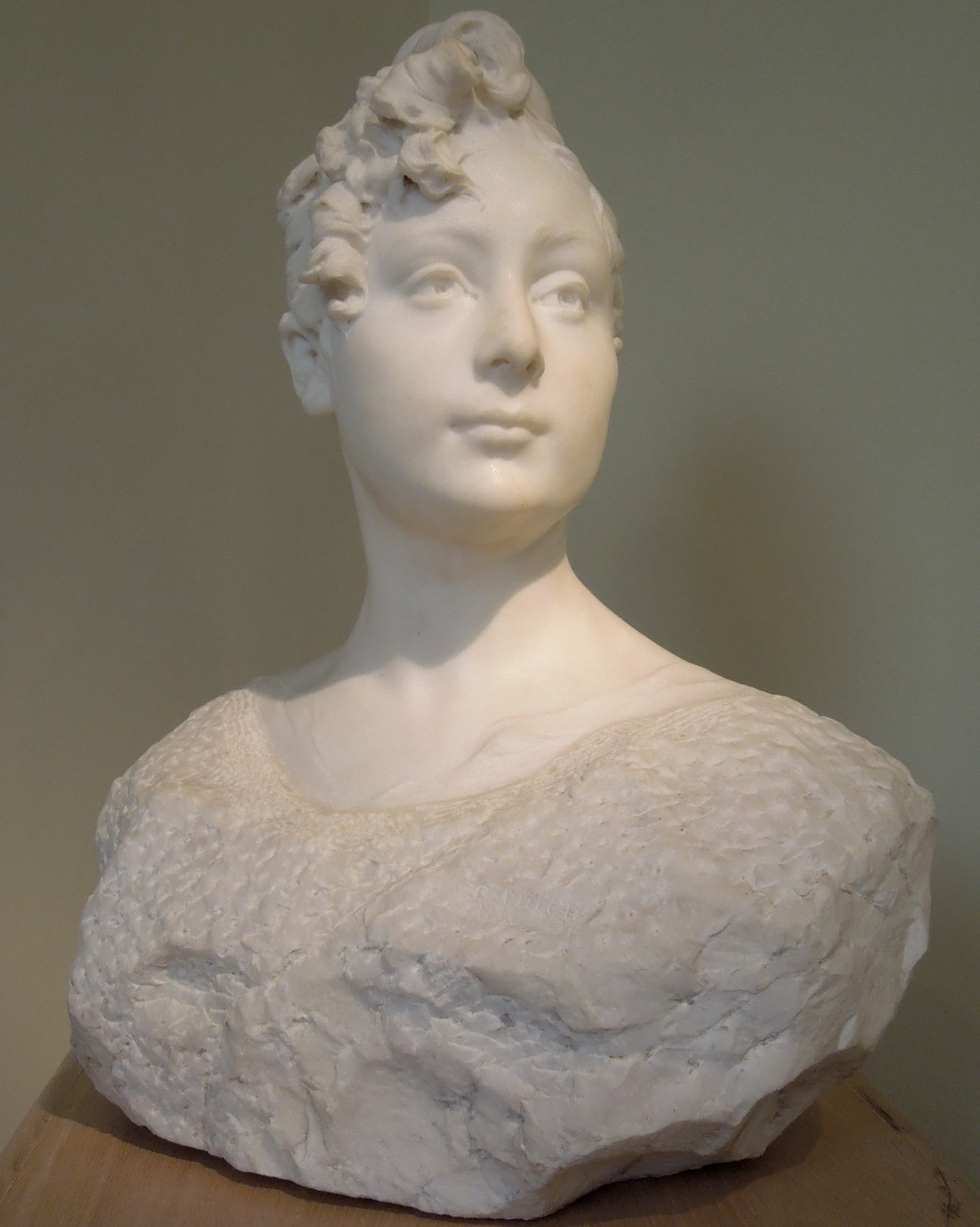
- Born: Antoinette Cauvin; 1864
- Died: 8 February 1924 (aged 59–60)
- Political party: Socialist Revolutionary Party
- Movement: anarcho-syndicalism

Antoinette Cauvin, known as Madame Sorgue (1864–1924), was a French anarcho-syndicalist orator and journalist. She was associated with many strikes in Europe and travelled widely in France, Portugal, Italy, Wales, England (Hull), Scotland, speaking in Leith to the Dockers during their strike in 1913.

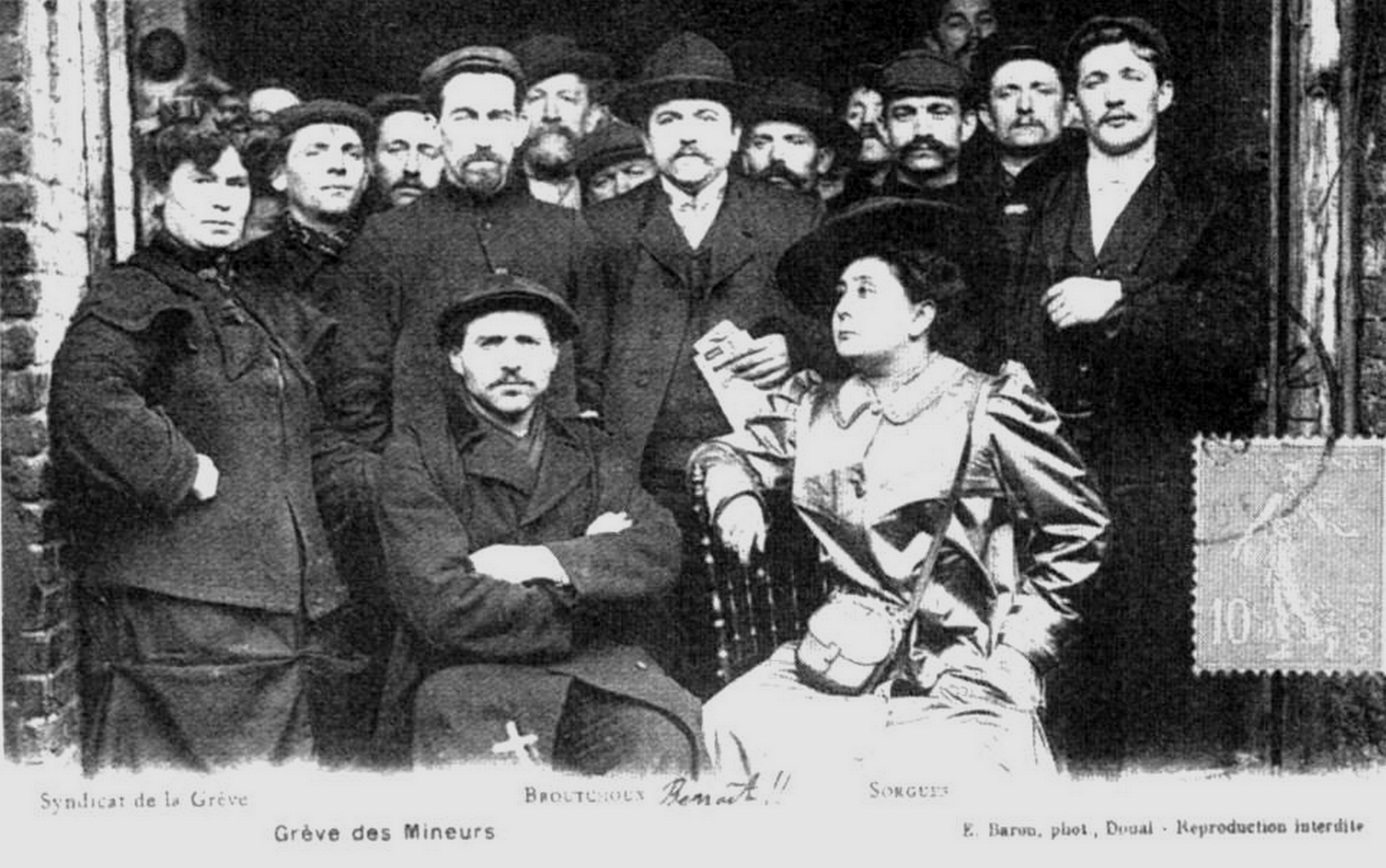
A group after the Courrières mine disaster, including Sorgue in the bottom right.

== Biography ==
Sorgue was born in 1864 to the Fourierist doctor and philosopher Joseph-Pierre Durand de Gros and Elisabeth Chripkoff.

Sorgue was known as the 'most dangerous woman in Europe' due to her role in spreading the ideas and methods of French syndicalism throughout Britain. In relation to the feminism of the time, Sorgue sided with the anti-parliamentarians and anarchists on the issue of women's suffrage and was a strong critic of marriage and the family. She was an orator and journalist, writing for the Journal des Débats.

She was a member of Blanquist Parti Socialiste Revolutionnaire (PSR) of Édouard Vaillant and represented the group in 1889 and 1900 at the general socialist congresses of Paris.

In 1905, she showed solidarity with textile workers in Limoges. She also met with famous Anarcho-Syndicalist, Tom Mann.

In 1914, during the First World War, she was one of the few anarchists to support the war.

She died of a heart attack in London on 8 February 1924 in Bonnington Hotel, Southampton Row.
