= Gustave Babin =

French journalist and art critic (1865–1939)

Gustave Babin (8 July 1865 – Casablanca 1939) was a French journalist and art critic. Much of his work was published in L'Illustration (1893 to 1923) and Journal des débats.

He was a friend of Paul Armand Silvestre who introduced him to the cinema. This led him to write an article in 1908 in which he discussed the excitement which various contemporary painters felt as regards the new medium. Also that year he had an article published in Scientific American dealing with "The making of Moving Pictures: How Their Fantastic Effects are Obtained".

During the First World War Babin was a war correspondent for L'Illustration. His account of the Foreign Legion (L'Illustration 19 Jan 1918) was translated into English as The Legion and published in 1918.

He moved to Morocco in 1923 where he edited l’Ere française.

== Publications ==
- 1902 Après faillite Paris: Dujarric
- 1912 Au Maroc en 1912 Paris: B. Grasset
- 1915 La bataille de la Marne (6-12 septembre 1914), esquisse d'un tableau d'ensemble Paris: Plon-Nourrit et Cie
- 1923 La mystérieuse Ouaouizert Casablanca: Faraire
- 1933 Le Maroc sans masque. Tome I: "Son Excellence." Paris: Ficker
