= Leith dockers' strike of 1913 =

The Leith dockers strike of 1913 was a strike of the dockers of Leith, Edinburgh, Scotland, from 26 June to 14 August 1913. The Dockers were part of the National Union of Dock Labourers (NUDL) union. The strike is said to have brought Leith to a standstill.

== Demands ==
The dockers were demanding an increase in pay, better conditions, a ban on hiring workers outside of the union, and shorter hours.

== Response from employers ==
With the help of the Shipping Federation, The Leith Dock Employers Association responded by bringing in 450 non-union workers or "free labourers" to break the strike, housing them in "free labour" ships, the Lady Jocelyn and the Paris. They were protected by the local police forces from Edinburgh and Leith, as well as by others who had been drafted in from Aberdeen, Glasgow, Lanarkshire, and the Lothians.

Access to the docks was restricted to police, free labourers, federation and harbour officials, and those with a valid permit. The dockers were unable to pass the dock's perimeter wall, so picketed in shifts. They were only allowed six pickets at a time and always escorted by the police. Questions were raised about the legality of closing a public dock. The authorities argued it was necessary to protect people and property.

== The strike grows ==
On 13 July the National Union of Railwaymen met and resolved to refuse to blackleg. Other workers and seamen also joined. The Lothian Miners soon came out in support of the dockers, and the Leith Dockers were supported by other dockers across the east coast of Scotland.

In July, there was a massive outburst in strikes, at the time being described as a "strike epidemic", after female ropeworkers also went on strike, followed by shipmasters.

The local newspaper reported this was unheard of, and that the "free labourers" brought in to do the strikers' jobs were unable to match the speed of those on strike, and were costly in terms of upkeep for the employers.

== Rioting ==
From 16 to 18 July, there was mass rioting. The workers brought in to replace the strikers were attacked and there is said to have been an attempt to blow up the perimeter wall. During this time, naval boats were sent in at the request of the authorities, but this only led to hostility from sailors and marines, who did not want to be used in this way.

== Effect on Parliament ==
Questions were raised in Parliament about the use of ships to attempt to break up the strike. The response given was that they came as a form of aid but were found to be unnecessary. MPs expressed unease about the secrecy surrounding the use of the ships.

Union officials attempted to control the situation but to no avail. The local press were sympathetic, reporting that the police had often provoked the situation.

== Demonstration of 20 July 1913 ==
Around the middle of July, Edinburgh Tramwaymen and Boilermakers joined the strike, and on 20 July 1913, demonstrated together with dockers, seamen, firemen and other trade unionists.

The local paper The Scotsman reported there were 3,000 dockers, 600 firemen and sailors, 500 tramwaymen, 150 boilermakers, mill girls and 350 children of the striking workers, led by two labour school board teachers, totalling about 4,600. During the procession, banners called for a living wage and protested the use of force. A loaf of bread painted green to look mouldy was held high, which the strikers suggested symbolised their share of profits.

The dockers and tramwaymen separated with the dockers and others heading along to Leith Links, where speeches were made. The French Anarcho-Syndicalist Madame Sorgue was one of the speakers. A later speaker suggested the solution lay in electoral politics, and advocated voting for the Labour party in upcoming elections. James Airlie from the Boilermakers union also spoke, pointing out the army had been used more times during the strike — 20 times, he claimed — than during the war.

== Pledges of financial support ==
The Tramwaymen's strike was called off on 2 August but they, along with the Amalgamated Society of Engineers (ASE), the Leith and Edinburgh Labour Party councillors and Edinburgh and Leith Trade Councils pledged financial support to the continuing dockers strike.

== The end of the strike ==
By the sixth week of the strike, those charged with rioting were in court, and soon found guilty. The local paper The Leith Observer, under the cover of a pseudonym, lambasted the decision.

The strike finally ended on 14 August, when James O'Connor Kessack informed a mass meeting of dockers at the Gaiety Theatre that more strike-breakers ready to cross the picketline were coming from Newcastle. Advised by the leadership of the NUDL, the assembled mass meeting voted by a large majority to end the strike. This came as a surprise to all, as no one had expected it to end so suddenly.

The dockers returned to work on the same conditions as before. As things returned to normal, many faced court for their part in the riots.

Repeated strikes of the dockers of Leith would continue into modern times, with another strike in 1983 when the Henry Robb Ltd shipyard was closed, and as part of the UK National Dock Strike 1989.

The Leith Dockers' Strike is covered in 4 pages of the book Red Scotland! The Rise and Fall of the Radical Left.
