= Self-Portrait with Beret and Turned-Up Collar =

1659 painting by Rembrandt

- Artist: Rembrandt
- Year: 1659
- Medium: Oil on canvas
- Movement: Dutch Golden Age painting
- Dimensions: 84.4 cm × 66 cm (33.2 in × 26 in)
- Location: National Gallery of Art, Washington, D.C.

Self-Portrait with Beret and Turned-Up Collar is a 1659 oil on canvas painting by the Dutch artist Rembrandt, and one of his over 40 self-portraits. It has been noted as a self-portrayal of subtle and somber qualities, a work in which may be seen "the stresses and strains of a life compounded of creative triumphs and personal and financial reverses". Once owned by Andrew W. Mellon, it has been in the National Gallery of Art since 1937.

== Description ==
In Self-Portrait with Beret and Turned-Up Collar Rembrandt is seated in a broadly painted fur cloak, his hands clasped in his lap. Light from the upper right fully illuminates the face, hollowing the form of the cheek, and allowing for the representation of blemishes on the right cheek and ear lobe. The picture is painted in a restrained range of browns and grays, enriched by a red shape that probably indicates the back of his chair, while another red area at the lower left corner of the canvas may be a tablecloth. The most luminous area, the artist's face, is framed by a large beret and the high collar that flatteringly hides his jowls. The skin of the face is modeled with thick, tactile pigment, painted with rich and varied colors suggesting both the artist's physical aging and the emotional effects of life experience.

At first Rembrandt painted himself wearing a light colored cap before opting for the black beret; since the original headdress was of a type that the artist included only in self-portraits where he is seen at the easel, it is possible that he initially intended for this painting to refer directly to his trade.

== Composition ==
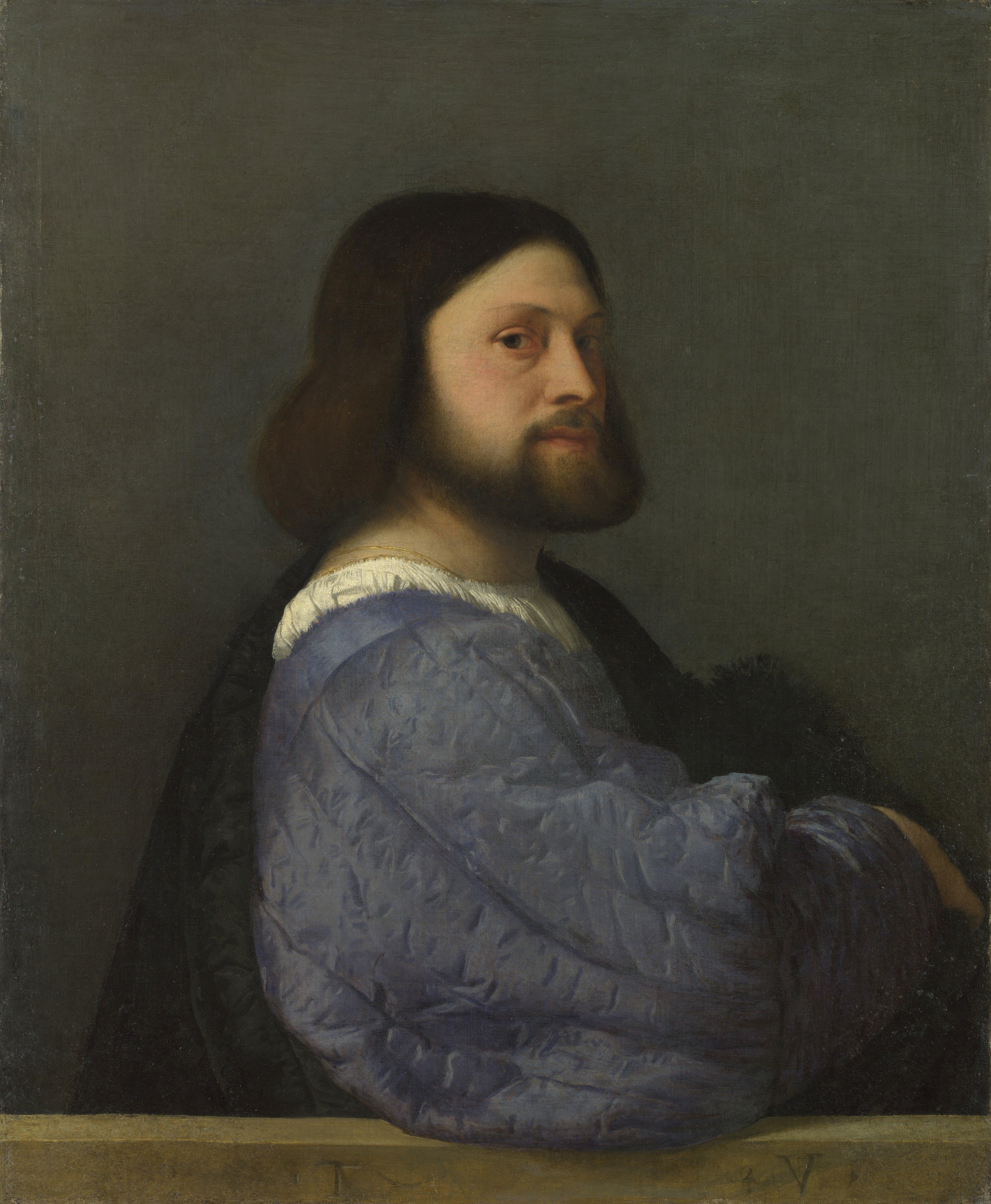
Titian, A Man with a Quilted Sleeve, c. 1510

The pose is reminiscent of several earlier works by Rembrandt, including an etching from 1639, Self-Portrait Leaning on a Stone Sill, and a painted self-portrait of 1640, now in the National Gallery in London. Both earlier pieces have been viewed as referential to the Portrait of Baldassare Castiglione (Louvre) by Raphael, as well as A Man with a Quilted Sleeve by Titian (NG, London), then wrongly thought to be a portrait of Ludovico Ariosto, which Rembrandt had seen in Amsterdam. The folded hands and the left arm covered in dark fabric are similar to the Raphael portrait.

Raphael, Portrait of Baldassare Castiglione, c. 1514–15

Also reminiscent of the Raphael painting are the positioning of the head and torso, unusual among Rembrandt's painted self-portraits. When painting himself, Rembrandt generally used the more convenient arrangement for a right-handed artist, placing the mirror to the left of the easel, so as not to have his view impeded by his working arm and hand, with the left side of the face most prominently featured. There are several frontal self-portraits, but Self-Portrait with Beret and Turned-Up Collar is one of only two, along with Self-Portrait as Zeuxis, that Rembrandt painted in which he is turned to the left, thus revealing more of the right side of his face. It has been suggested that this difference in angle was an intentional variation from the series of self-portraits he was painting at the time.

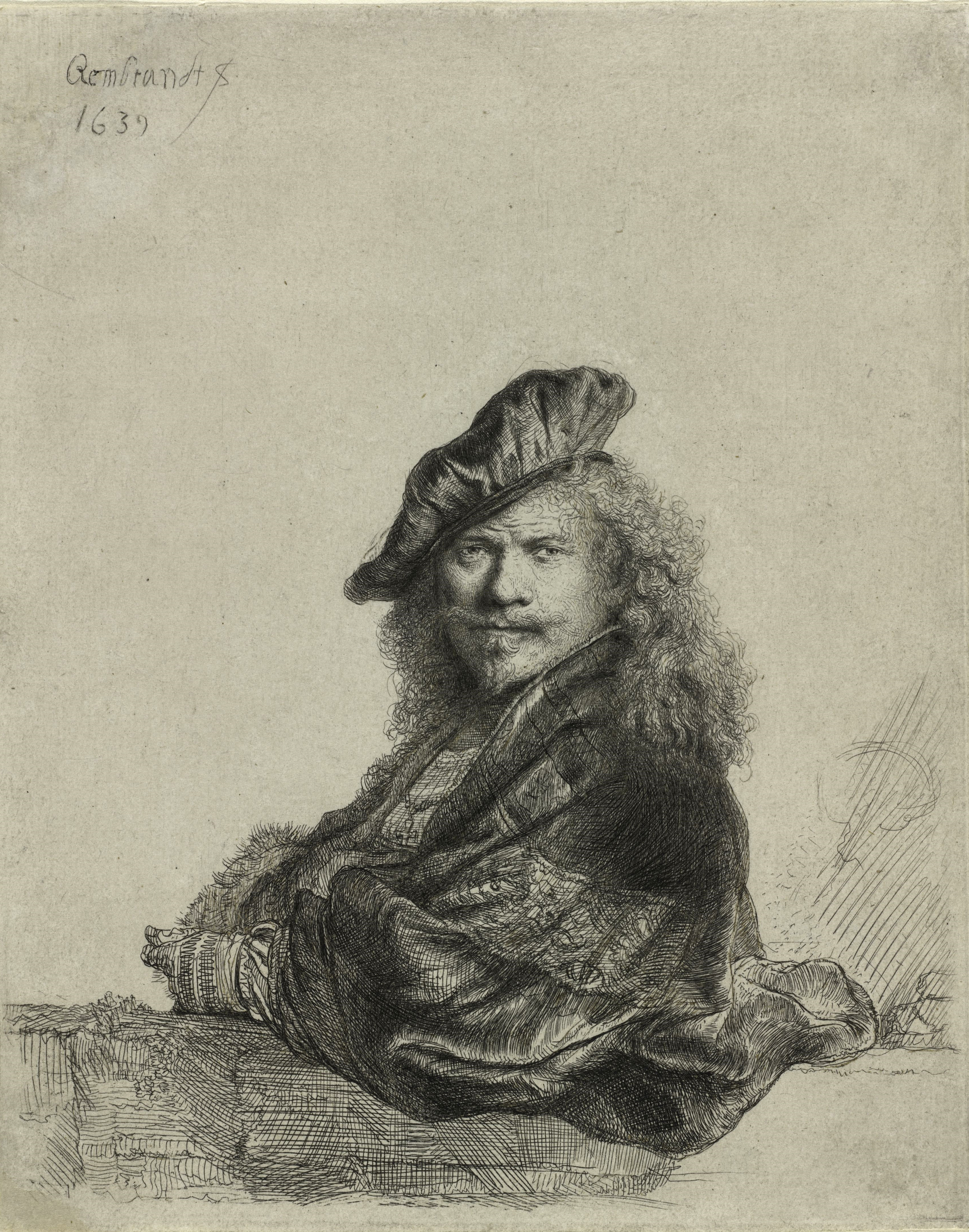
Self-portrait Leaning on a Stone Sill, etching, 1639. This etching and the painted self-portrait of 1640 were inspired by paintings by Raphael and Titian.

Self-Portrait with Beret and Turned-Up Collar derives from the same period as the more finished and identically titled canvas in the National Gallery of Scotland in Edinburgh. Both the clothing and physical condition of the face suggest a date close to 1659. The same clothing appears in a small, unfinished Self-Portrait with Beret in the Musée Granet.

== Process ==
Less finished than many other self-portraits by Rembrandt, the rich expressiveness of brushwork, especially in the face, has merited attention. In some passages the manipulation of pigment appears independent of the forms being described. For Rembrandt researcher Ernst van de Wetering "The paint seems to have been applied, as it were, with a shaving brush". Although the painting's attribution has been questioned due to its freedom of execution, it is likely that Rembrandt chose to leave the canvas at an intermediate stage of development, for x-radiographs have revealed that other portraits by his hand have thickly applied passages that were subsequently worked over with thinner, more refined touches of paint. The palpable sense of plastic form in the face of Self-Portrait with Beret and Turned-Up Collar is the result not of careful transitions of value and color, but rather, of the textural vibrancy of the brushwork.

For all the rough dynamism of the painting's surface, there is no compromise in the illusion of atmospheric quality, as some passages are painted to appear in sharper focus, while others are less so; often this is the result of the variation between areas of densely impasted paint and those composed of blurred brushstrokes. The relief of the paint creates reflections of light that simulate the tactile nature of flesh. Strokes of thick paint, warm in tone, pool up to represent areas of reflected light on the forehead, nose, and cheek. Adjacent to these passages, at the temple, around the furrows of the right eye and the wing of the nostril, are interstices of green-gray underpainting. The right eyeball is painted with a series of transparent glazes, atop which is placed a drop of white lead pigment for the highlight. This eye is surrounded by a complex variety of brushwork: the brow is formed by an uneven series of strokes; a single stroke designates the fold above the upper lid; the skin above the cheek is molded with a rounded brush; the wrinkles at the corner of the eye are denoted by a stroke of wet paint dragged over a dry underpainting. A blunt object, likely a brush handle, was used to accent a wrinkle beneath the eye, and to score into the wet paint of the hair, creating sharp curls against which the broader passages of hair recede.

The practice of surface variation as a means of illusionism—"kenlijkheyt", or perceptibility—was understood by some of Rembrandt's contemporaries. Even so, the dramatic differences between the paint application in the face and passages of the drapery and background are unusual for a late self-portrait. The overall impression is that of a complete work, one that presents the subject as marked by experience yet ultimately resolute in dignity.

== Condition ==
The original support is a canvas of fine thread, and has been lined, with white lead applied to the rear of the lining. The painting has two grounds, one a thick red-brown, the other a thin gray. The figure was initially drawn with brown underpaint left exposed in several places, now abraded. The face and hands are in good condition; extensively damaged areas in the figure and background have been covered with black overpainting, some of which was removed during a 1992 restoration.

== Provenance ==
The painting's whereabouts are known from 1767, when it was owned by George, 3rd Duke of Montagu and 4th Earl of Cardigan, and was then passed down to his daughter, Lady Elizabeth, wife of Henry, 3rd Duke of Buccleuch of Montagu House, London. It was then owned by John Charles, 7th Duke of Buccleuch, and was purchased in 1929 by Andrew W. Mellon, who left it to the A.W. Mellon Educational and Charitable Trust in 1934. The painting was given to the National Gallery of Art in 1937.

== Related self-portraits by Rembrandt ==
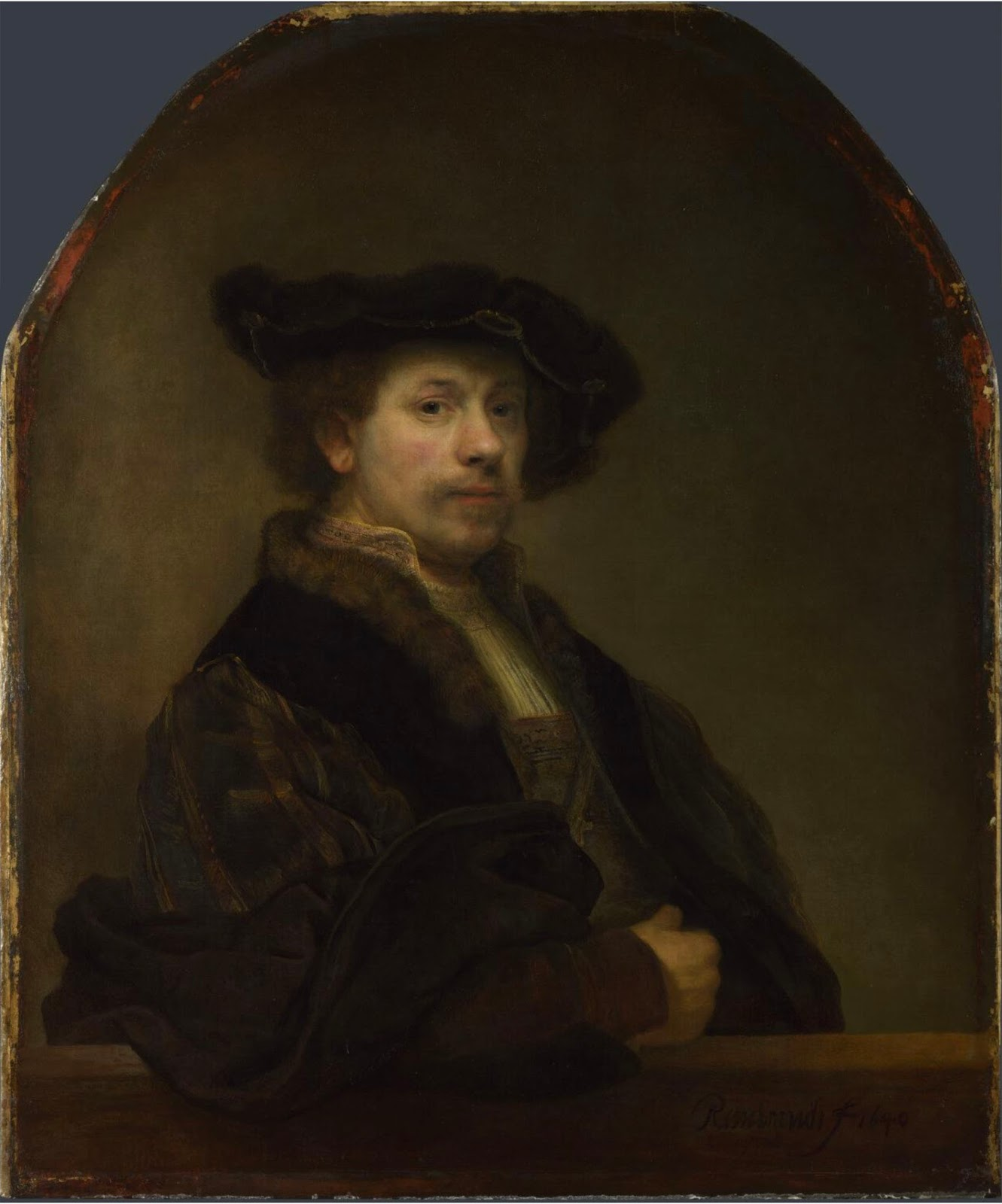
Self-Portrait, 1640. The pose of this and the previous etching preface that of Self-Portrait with Beret and Turned-Up Collar in Washington, D.C.

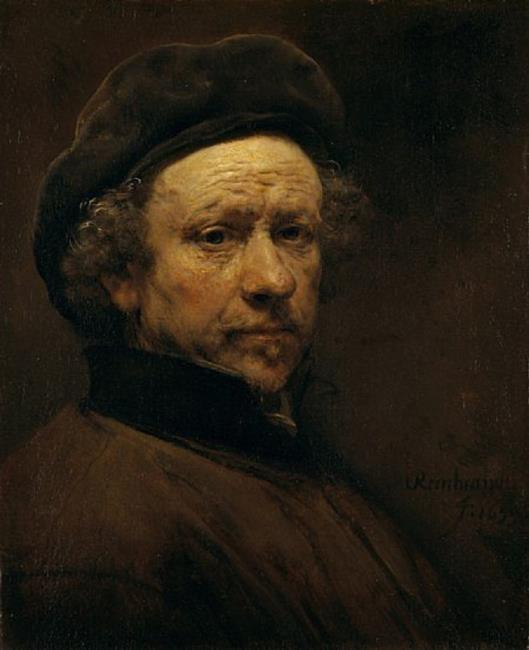
Self-Portrait with Beret and Turned-Up Collar, National Gallery of Scotland, Edinburgh, c. 1659. Physical similarities suggest this dates from about the same time as the Washington portrait.

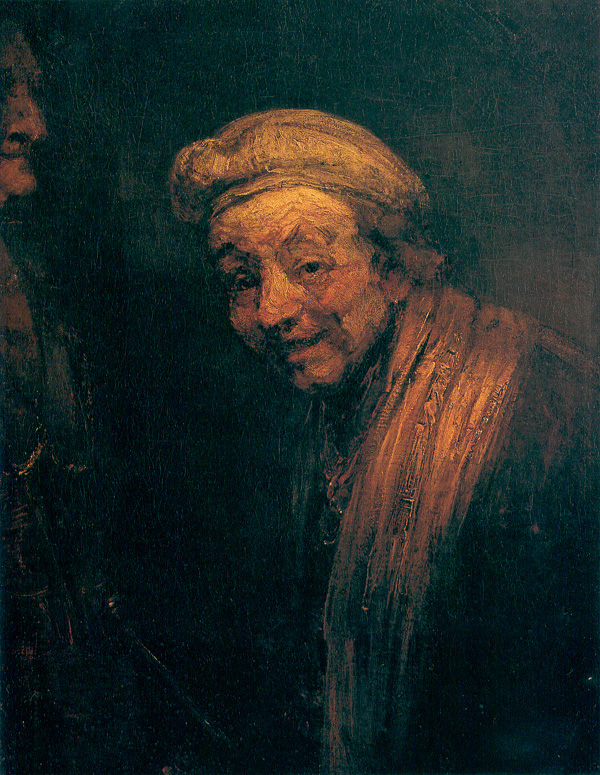
Self-Portrait as Zeuxis, c. 1662. The only other painted self-portrait in which Rembrandt is turned to the left.

== See also ==
- List of paintings by Rembrandt
