= Louis-François Bertin de Vaux =

French journalist and politician (1771–1842)

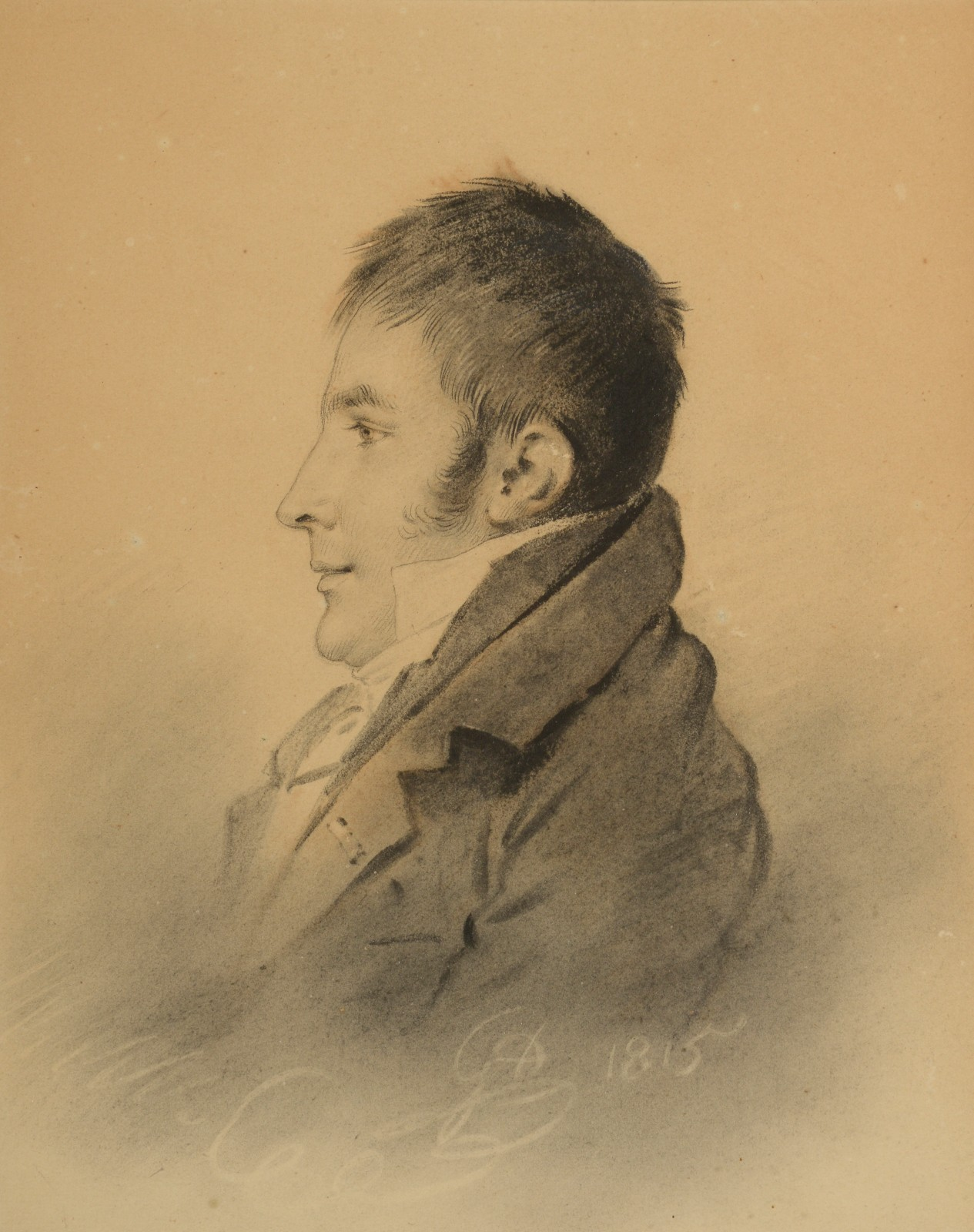
- Bertin de Vaux in 1815
- Born: 18 August 1771; Paris
- Died: 23 April 1842 (aged 70)
- Occupation: French journalist

Louis-François Bertin de Vaux (French pronunciation: [lwi fʁɑ̃swa bɛʁtɛ̃ də vo]; 18 August 1771 – 23 April 1842) was a French journalist.

Louis was the younger brother of Louis-François Bertin. He took a leading part in the conduct of his brother's paper Journal des Débats, to the success of which his powers of writing greatly contributed. He entered the Chamber of Deputies in 1815, was made Councillor of State in 1827, and a peer of France in 1830.
