= Édouard Bertin =

French painter (1797–1871)

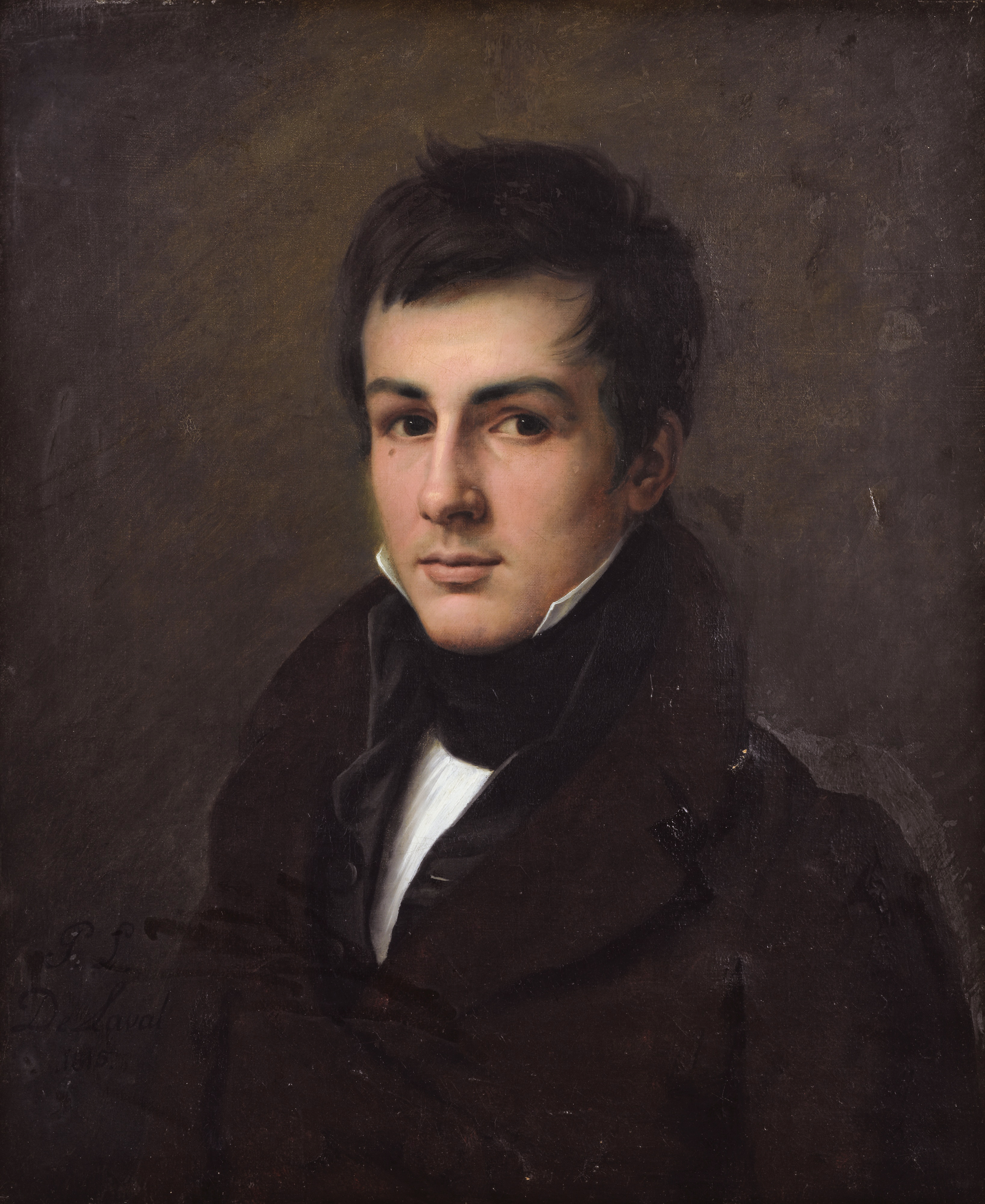
Edouard Bertin (Pierre-Louis Delaval, 1815)

François-Édouard Bertin (French pronunciation: [fʁɑ̃swa edwaʁ bɛʁtɛ̃]; 1797–1871) was a French painter born in Paris, and the son of the renowned journalist Louis-François Bertin. Édouard studied under Girodet-Trioson and Bidauld. He represented the details and general character of a landscape with great skill, but was less successful in his colouring. He was inspector of the Beaux Arts, and from 1854, was the director of the Journal des Débats. Bertin died in Paris in 1871.

== Selected works ==
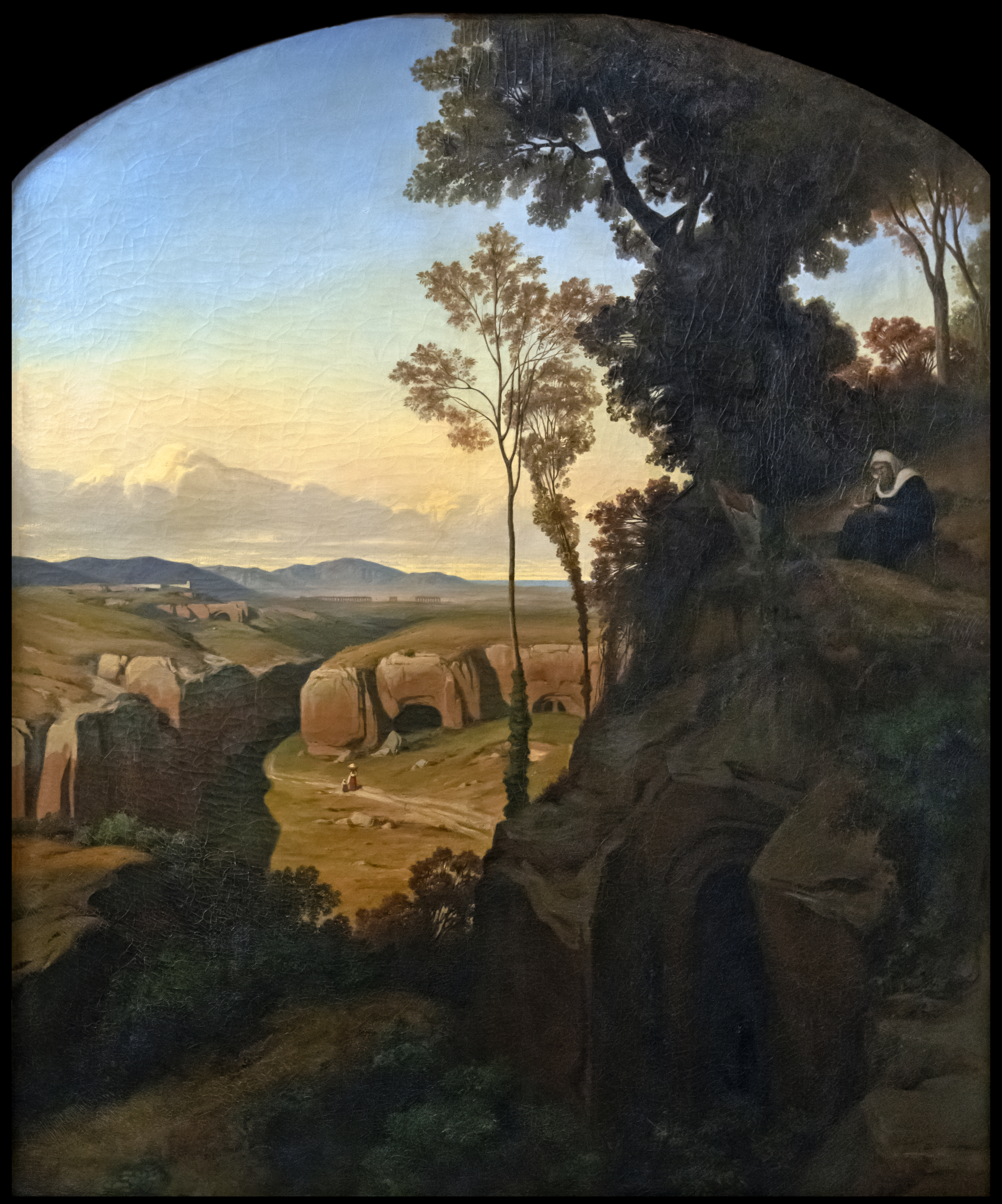
View of the quarries of Cervara, Carcassonne

- Cimabue meeting with Giotto.
- Christ on the Mount of Olives. 1837.
- A view of Olevano.
- View of the querries of Cervara.
- Scene from the Cervara quarries.
- The old Tombs on the Nile.
- The Forest of Fontainebleau.
- View of an excavated Monastery near Viterbo.
