= Journal des débats =

Defunct French newspaper

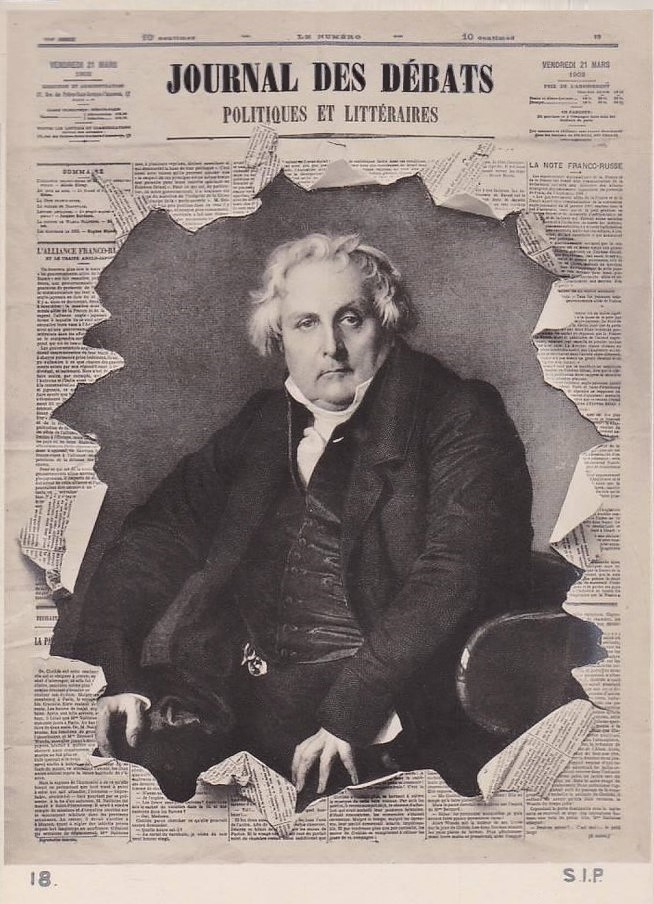
Journal des Débats - Portrait of monsieur Bertin, director, by Ingres

The Journal des débats (French pronunciation: [ʒuʁnal de deba], Journal of Debates) was a French newspaper, published between 1789 and 1944 that changed title several times. Created shortly after the first meeting of the Estates-General of 1789, it was, after the outbreak of the French Revolution, the exact record of the debates of the National Assembly, under the title Journal des Débats et des Décrets ("Journal of Debates and Decrees").

Published weekly rather than daily, it was headed for nearly forty years by Bertin l'Aîné and was owned for a long time by the Bertin family. During the First Empire it was opposed to Napoleon and had a new title imposed on it, the Journal de l'Empire.

During the first Bourbon Restoration (1813–1814), the Journal took the title Journal des Débats Politiques et Littéraires, and, under the second Restoration, it took a conservative rather than reactionary position. Under Charles X and his entourage, the Journal changed to a position supporting the liberal opposition represented by the Doctrinaires (Guizot, Royer-Collard, etc.) (1827–1829).

The Journal des Débats was the most read newspaper of the Restoration and the July Monarchy, before being surpassed by Émile de Girardin's La Presse and later by Le Petit Journal. The many contributions established the Journal's reputation as a major influence on French culture, and especially French literature for the first half of the 19th century.

During the German occupation of France in World War II, the Journal continued to be published, which caused it to be suppressed after the Liberation of Paris in 1944.

== Famous contributors ==
- Henry Aron
- Gustave Babin
- Hector Berlioz
- Maurice Blanchot
- Castil-Blaze
- Brada
- François-René de Chateaubriand
- Alexandre Dumas, père
- Charles-Marie de Féletz
- Léon Foucault
- Julien Louis Geoffroy
- Bernard Adolphe Granier de Cassagnac
- Victor Hugo
- Jules Janin
- Conrad Malte-Brun
- Charles Nodier
- Ferdinando Petruccelli della Gattina
- Ernest Reyer
- Eugène Sue
- Madame Sorgue
- George Barbu Știrbei
- Jean-Baptiste Louvet de Couvray
- John Lemoinne
