= Julien Louis Geoffroy =

French literary critic (1743–1814)

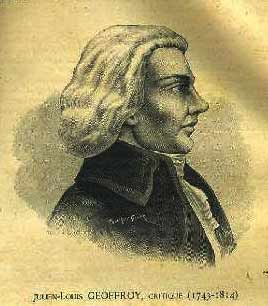

Julien Louis Geoffroy (French pronunciation: [ʒyljɛ̃ lwi ʒɔfʁwa]; 17 August 1743 – 27 February 1814) was a French literary critic.

He was born at Rennes, and educated there and at the Collège Louis le Grand in Paris. He took orders and for some time was a mere usher, eventually becoming professor of rhetoric at the Collège des Quatre-Nations. His tragedy, Caton, was accepted at the Théâtre Français, but was never performed. On the death of Élie Fréron in 1776 the other collaborators in the Année littéraire asked Geoffroy to succeed him, and he conducted the journal until its closure in 1792.

Geoffroy was a bitter critic of Voltaire and his followers, and made for himself many enemies. An enthusiastic royalist, he published, with Fréron's brother-in-law, the abbé Thomas Royou (1741–1792), a journal, L'Ami du roi (1790–1792), which possibly did more harm than good to the king's cause by its ill-advised partisanship. During the Reign of Terror, Geoffroy hid in the neighbourhood of Paris, only returning in 1799.

An attempt to revive the Année littéraire failed, and Geoffroy undertook the position of theatre critic of the Journal des Débats. His scathing criticisms had a success of notoriety, but their popularity was ephemeral, and the publication of them (5 vols., 1819–1820) as Cours de littérature dramatique proved a failure. He was also the author of a perfunctory Commentaire on the works of Jean Racine prefixed to Lenormant's edition (1808).
