= Charles-Marie de Féletz =

French churchman, journalist and literary critic (1767–1850)

Charles-Marie de Féletz (3 January 1767, Gumont – 11 February 1850) was a French churchman, journalist and literary critic. He was the son of Étienne Feletz d'Orimond and Catherine de Fars.
