= Louise de Broglie, Countess d'Haussonville =

French writer (1818–1882)

Louise de Broglie
- Countess d'Haussonville
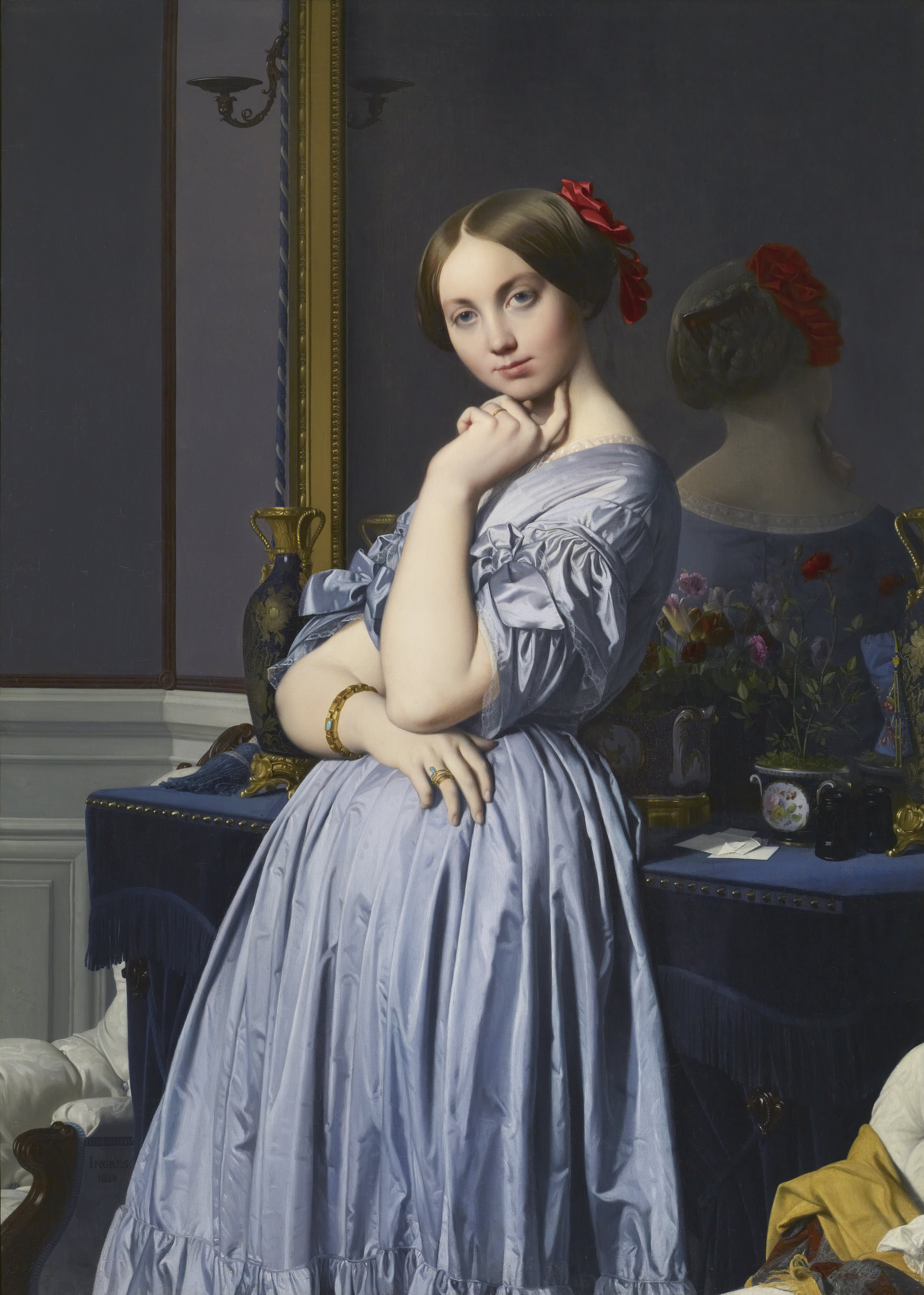
- Portrait of Comtesse d'Haussonville by Ingres (1845)
- Born: Louise Albertine, Princess de Broglie; 25 May 1818; Coppet, Switzerland
- Died: 21 April 1882 (aged 63); Paris, France
- Noble family: House of Broglie
- Spouse: Joseph d'Haussonville
- Issue: Victor-Bernard; Mathilde; Gabriel Paul Othenin de Cléron, comte d'Haussonville
- Father: Duc Victor de Broglie
- Mother: Albertine, Baroness Staël von Holstein
- Occupation: Writer

Louise de Broglie, Countess d'Haussonville (25 May 1818 – 21 April 1882) was a French essayist and biographer, and a member of the House of Broglie, a distinguished French family. A granddaughter of the novelist Germaine de Staël, she was considered independent, liberal, and outspoken. Her 1845 portrait by Jean-Auguste-Dominique Ingres, which took three years to complete, has been exhibited in the Frick Collection in New York City since the 1930s.

== Early life and family ==
Titled from birth (as was the custom in her father's aristocratic family) as Louise Albertine, Princess de Broglie, she was the daughter of statesman and diplomat Victor de Broglie, 3rd Duke de Broglie and Albertine, Baroness Staël von Holstein. She was the oldest of three children to survive to adulthood; her brother Albert would inherit the de Broglie ducal title and achieve political and literary renown, while her youngest brother Auguste, the future Abbé de Broglie, would pursue an ecclesiastical career. Through her mother, Louise was the granddaughter of famed saloniste and novelist Germaine de Staël, better known as Madame de Staël. Although de Staël died a year before her birth, Louise was born in her grandmother's Château de Coppet in Switzerland, a residence made famous through de Staël's writings and cultural notoriety. She would inherit the Coppet estate in 1878, and be buried there; the property, which has been open to the public since 1924–1925, is still owned by the Countess d'Haussonville's descendants.

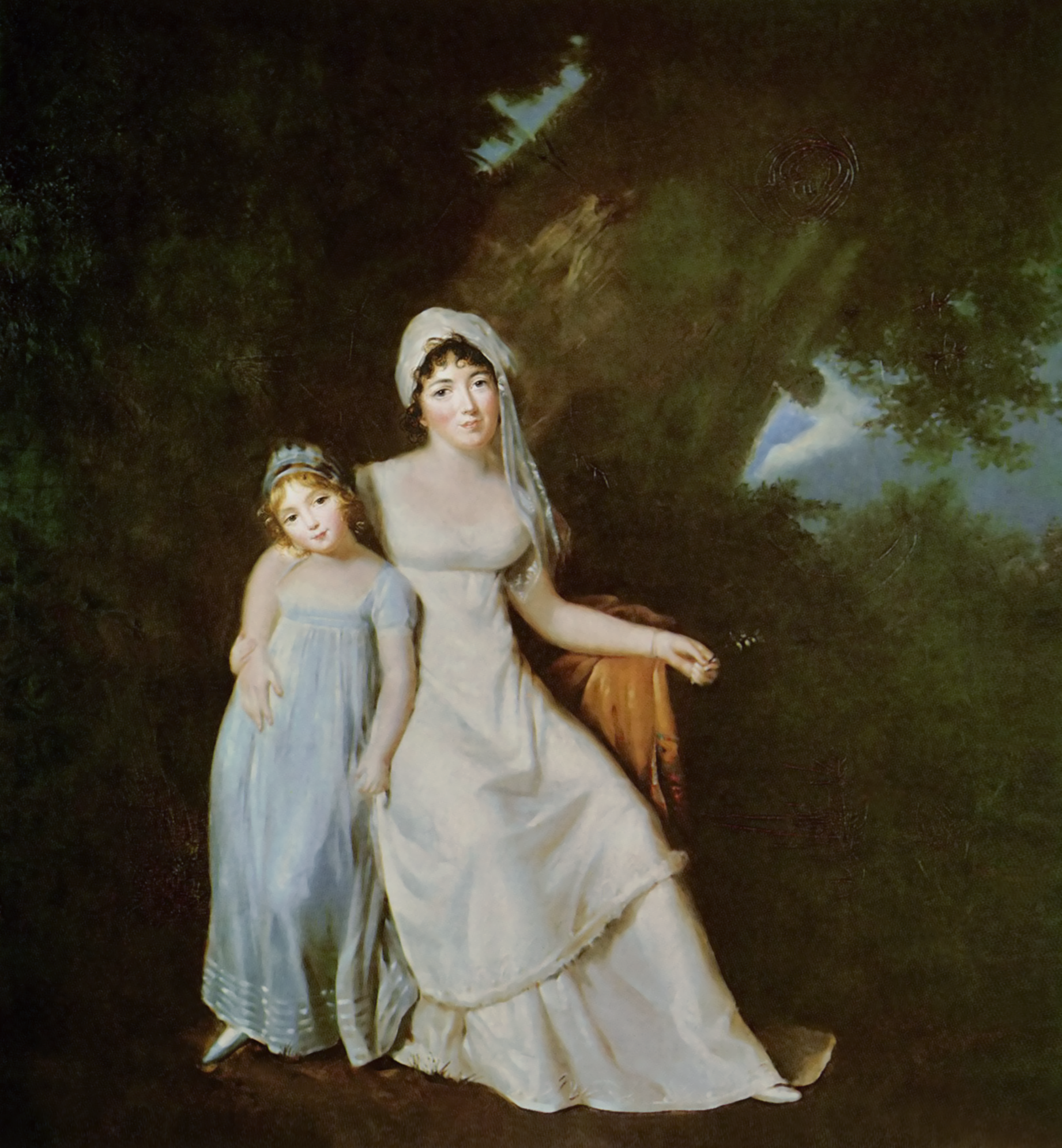
Marguerite Gérard, Mme de Staël et sa fille, c. 1805 (Château de Coppet Collection). Louise de Broglie's mother and grandmother, painted 13 years before her birth

Germaine de Staël was the daughter of the Swiss banker and politician Jacques Necker, who had been Louis XVI's director-general of finance, and his wife Suzanne Curchod, the poor but well-educated daughter of a Swiss pastor (Curchod had previously been engaged to historian Edward Gibbon). Louise's maternal grandfather was said to be Erik Magnus Staël von Holstein, Swedish Ambassador to France, but as de Staël also maintained a longstanding romantic relationship and intellectual collaboration with liberal political activist and writer Benjamin Constant, who believed he fathered Albertine (Louise's mother), it is possible that Constant was her biological grandfather.

Louise wrote an unpublished autobiography recounting a highly cultured education and upbringing. From an early age, she was enthusiastic about literature and music, opera in particular—Ingres would later include opera glasses in her portrait. Notably intellectual, she was said to have read every new book. At age 11, she attended the opening night of Victor Hugo's play "Hernani", famous for the demonstrations it provoked; as a young pianist, she had personally known Chopin. She was also considered a talented watercolorist, capable of painting dramatic, convincing scenes. Nevertheless, she took personal criticism to heart, recalling that her mother in childhood likened her to "a pretty vase without handles"; another critic told her (at age nine) that her character "had not enough nourishment in it to sustain a dog", and compared her to "a field mouse, a topaz, a roe deer, a blue fairy and a spark". According to this same person, her heraldic emblem should have been a runaway horse.

In October 1836 at age 18, she married the future French National Assembly member and historian Joseph d'Haussonville (1809–1884). "I was destined to beguile, to attract, to seduce, and in the final reckoning to cause suffering in all those who sought their happiness in me", Louise wrote; "I wanted to marry young and have a brilliant position in society. And that, basically, was the only reason I wanted to marry him", she said. Upon her marriage, she became Louise de Cléron, Viscountess d'Haussonville. (She would later become Louise de Cléron, Countess d'Haussonville upon the death of her father-in-law in 1846.) Whatever her initial sentiments, the marriage seems to have evolved into a happy one; the couple lived in the Hôtel de Broglie, 35 rue Saint-Dominique, a residence renovated for them by the fashionable architect and interior designer Hippolyte Destailleur. They had three children: Victor-Bernard (1837–1838), who died in infancy, Mathilde (1839–1898), who never married, and Gabriel Paul Othenin Bernard, known as Paul-Gabriel d'Haussonville (1843–1924), a renowned politician and essayist, through whom she has many descendants.

Louise is unique in history for being the daughter, sister, spouse, and mother of four members of the French Academy: Her father Victor, brother Albert, husband Joseph, and son Paul-Gabriel did not occupy their Academy seats simultaneously, with Paul-Gabriel elected in 1888, six years after his mother's death. Louise was the great-aunt of Louis de Broglie, who would win the 1929 Nobel Prize in Physics for his foundational work on quantum theory. She was also the great-grandmother of philologist Béatrix d'Andlau (1893–1989) and her brother Jean Le Marois (1895–1978), poet and dramatist, who were both members of the Andlau family.

== Literary career ==
Louise was considered independent, liberal, and outspoken, both by the standards of the day and particularly given the circumstances of her elevated social rank. She published an extended biographical essay in 1858 on the Irish nationalist Robert Emmet, an 1861 biography of Marie Adélaïde of Savoy (Souvenirs d'une demoiselle d'honneur de Mme la duchesse de Bourgogne), and an 1870 biography of Marguerite of Valois (Marguerite de Valois, reine de Navarre). In 1872 and 1874, she published a two-volume biography of Lord Byron (La Jeunesse de Lord Byron and Les Dernières Années de Lord Byron: Les rives du Lac de Genève, l'Italie, la Grece), which drew from her grandmother Madame de Staël's observations and interactions with the English poet. In 1875, she published a biography and critique of the works of Charles Augustin Sainte-Beuve (C.-A. Sainte-Beuve: sa vie et ses oeuvres).

== Portrait by Ingres ==
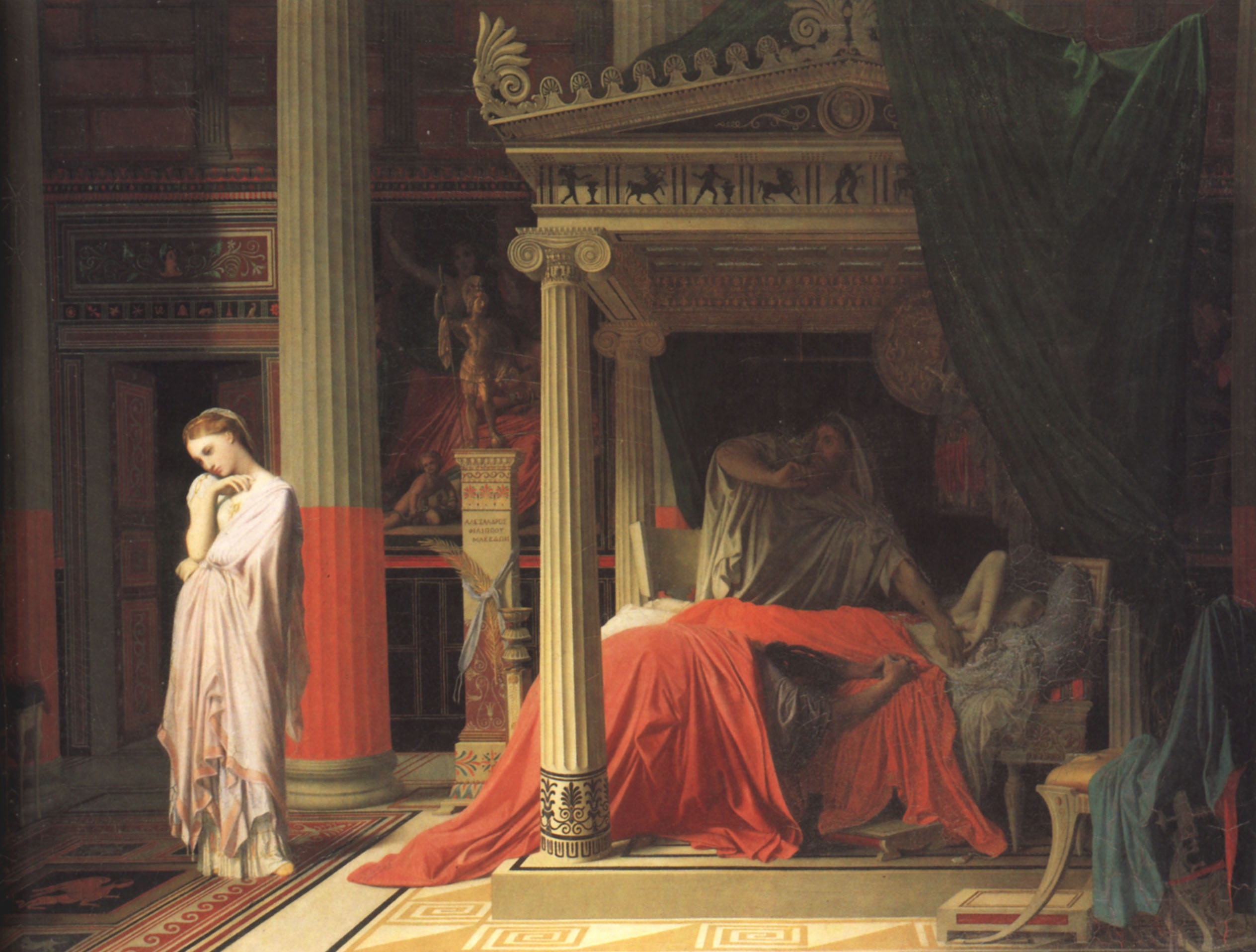
Ingres, Antiochus and Stratonice, 1840

In 1838, two years into the marriage, Viscount d'Haussonville sought to have his wife's portrait painted by Franz Xaver Winterhalter, a favorite of European royalty, but Winterhalter was unavailable. They next considered Jean-Auguste-Dominique Ingres; Louise and her husband first met Ingres in Rome in 1840, while he was directing the French Academy in Rome and living at the Villa Medici. They became convinced of his suitability to paint her portrait after viewing his recently completed Antiochus and Stratonice (today in the Condé Museum).

At around the same time, Ingres, by then 60 years old and convinced his reputation would be secured through larger-scale undertakings, expressed dismay to a friend that "everyone wants" portraits. "There are six that I am refusing or trying to avoid because I can't bear them. Well, it was not to paint portraits that I returned to Paris." Although it is unknown whether Louise's portrait was among those commissions Ingres hoped to avoid, preliminary sketches indicate that by summer 1842 he had taken up the task. From the perspective of both painter and sitter, the process was not easy. Louise would spend months abroad at a time, and her sittings were interrupted by pregnancy. At least 16 preparatory sketches exist, as well as an early trial portrait in oil, and with dozens of drapery studies, some 60 extant Ingres works are thought to have informed the finished work. Ingres significantly revised Louise's costume and refined her facial expression, adding extensive notes to at least one working draft: "indent the nostril", "chin sharper", "eyeballs smaller", "nose narrower". He once told his pupil Amaury Duval that as difficult as portraiture was, women's portraits posed a particular challenge: "It can't be done", he said. "It's enough to make one weep." Ingres spent the first six months of 1845 working intensely on the portrait, which was finished by summer of that year.

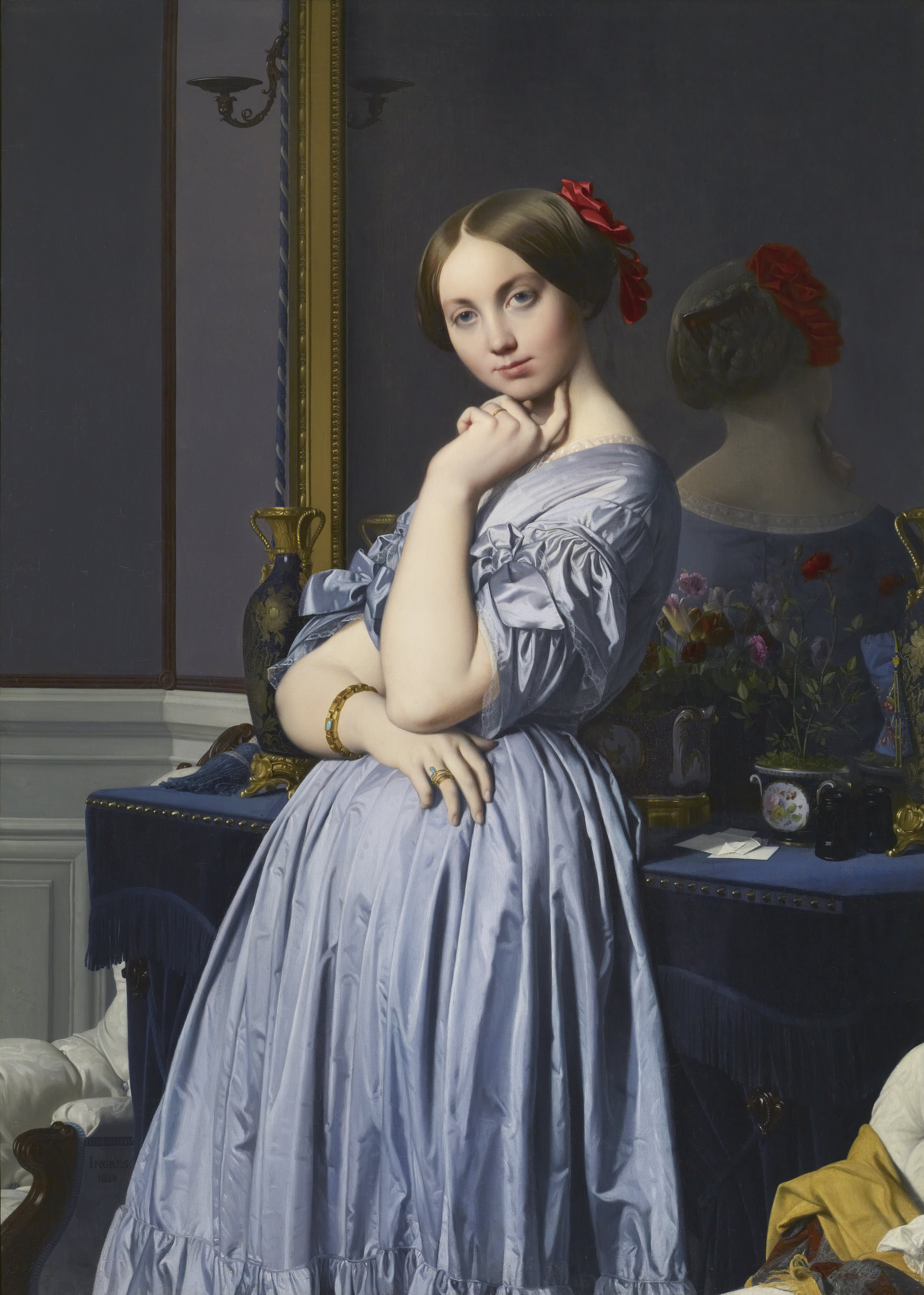
Enlarged detail of the Countess's head and left hand, showing her hand's impossible reflection in the mirror

Art historian (and Frick curator emeritus) Edgar Munhall has suggested that both "Antiochus and Stratonice" as well as Ingres's portrait of Louise owe an inspirational debt to the pose of Pudicitia ("modesty" or "sexual valor"), a Roman statue of a goddess on display in the Vatican collection. In his book on Ingres, Robert Rosenblum connects her pose to Polyhymnia, muse of sacred poetry, hymn, and eloquence, as depicted particularly in the Louvre's Roman copy of a Greek original. Regardless of the specific inspiration, Ingres's portrait of Louise depicts a woman both modest and worldly, her gaze fixed on the viewer who seems almost to have surprised her, after her return from the opera, having casually removed her evening wrap.

Many critics have noted the anatomical impossibility of Louise's pose, her right arm seeming to originate at her left shoulder. It would also be impossible to see Louise's raised hand in the mirror's reflection, though Ingres included it. Although many viewers have assumed Louise's portrait faithfully reflects contemporary fashion, recent scholarship has established that Louise's dress was pointedly out-of-style by the time Ingres painted her, as if to emphasize that the subject's intelligence and relative informality trumped her allegiance to fashionable trends.

The painting remained in the family's private possession for eighty years, though it was displayed publicly on occasion. Its first Paris exhibition in 1846 created "a storm of approval among her family and friends", Ingres wrote a friend, relaying in confidence that a prominent politician had written Louise saying "M Ingres must be in love with you to have painted you this way". The portrait was subsequently exhibited in 1855, 1867, 1874, and 1910, and was engraved in 1889 and again in 1910; it was also circulated in photographed form.

Following the death of Paul-Gabriel d'Haussonville in 1924, his descendants sold the painting to offset estate taxes to art dealer Georges Wildenstein, from whom it was next acquired by the Frick Collection for $125,000 in 1927. It has been almost continuously on public display in New York City since the opening of Henry Clay Frick's home as a museum in 1935. Unlike works acquired directly by Frick before his death in 1919, Comtesse d'Haussonville can be loaned and exhibited elsewhere, and made its first visit to California in 2009–2010 where it was the centerpiece of an exhibit by the Norton Simon Museum. The painting returned to Europe in early 2015 where it was exhibited at the Mauritshuis in The Hague.
