= Portrait of Comtesse d'Haussonville =

1845 painting by Jean-Auguste-Dominique Ingres

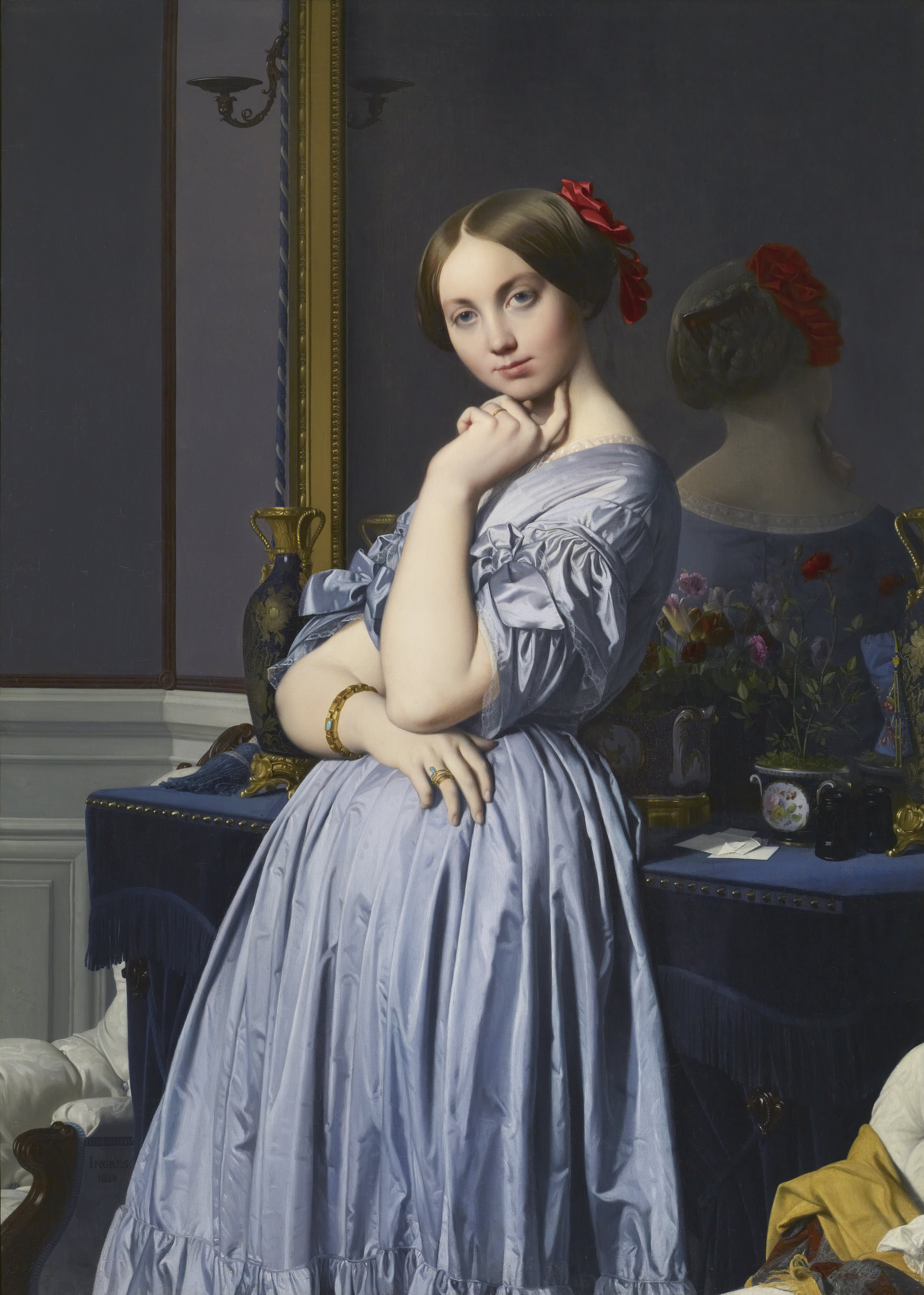
- Artist: Jean-Auguste-Dominique Ingres
- Year: 1845
- Medium: Oil on canvas
- Dimensions: 131.8 cm × 92.1 cm (51.9 in × 36.3 in)
- Location: Frick Collection, New York
- Accession: 1927.1.81
- Website: collections.frick.org/objects/105/louise-princesse-de-broglie-later-the-comtesse-dhaussonvi

The Portrait of Comtesse d'Haussonville is an 1845 oil-on-canvas painting by the French Neoclassical artist Jean-Auguste-Dominique Ingres. The sitter was Louise de Broglie, Countess d'Haussonville, of the wealthy House of Broglie. The Princesse de Broglie, who Ingres later portrayed c. 1851–53, was married to Louise's brother Albert de Broglie, the French monarchist politician, diplomat and writer. Highly educated, Louise de Broglie was later an essayist and biographer and published historical romance novels based on the lives of Lord Byron, Robert Emmett and Margaret of Valois.

The painting is one of the few portrait commissions Ingres accepted at the time, as he was more interested in Neoclassical subject matter, which, to his frustration, was a far less lucrative source of income than portraiture. He had made a preparatory sketch and had begun an oil and canvas version two years earlier, but abandoned the commission when de Broglie became pregnant and was no longer able to pose for the long periods he required, and she had anyway found interminable and "boring". The final work is signed and dated at the lower left.

== Commission ==
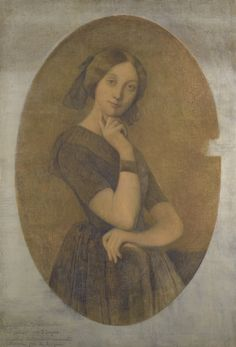
First oil on canvas version of Portrait of Comtesse d'Haussonville, 1842

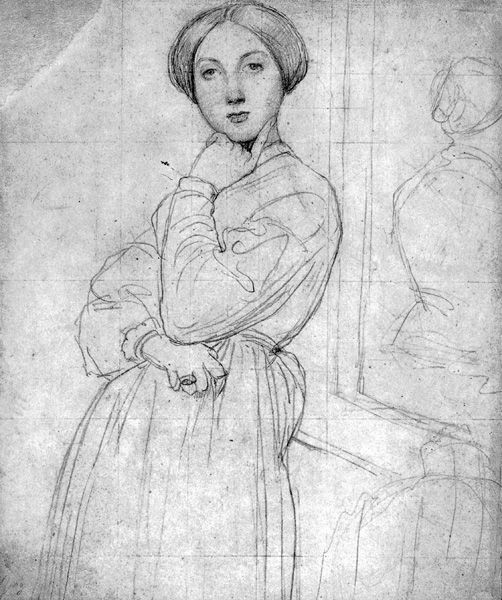
Preparatory drawing; graphite and white highlights on paper, 1842

By 1845 Ingres' fame was at its height, and he was much in demand as a portraitist. While lucrative, he found the format distracting from, and inferior to, his main interest of History painting. At the time, he committed to only two portraits; the current work and the Portrait of Baronne de Rothschild. Today, however, it is for portraits such as these that he is best known.

Louise de Broglie (1818–1882) was 27 at the time of the portrait. Ingres had two to three years earlier sketched her with black chalk as a preparatory drawing and begun an oil-on-canvas painting, which excludes the mirror and reflected images and reverses the pose, but that was abandoned. The sessions were long and slow, and de Broglie found them wearisome, at one stage complaining "for the last nine days Ingres has been painting on one of the hands". She fell pregnant with her third child, was thus unable to pose further, and the 1842 painting remains unfinished.

Ever contrary, Ingres later complained that he was unhappy with de Broglie's final portrait and that he had failed to fully capture her charms. He was relieved when the portrait was met with approval from her family, writing that "family, friends, and above all the loving father [the duc de Broglie] were delighted with it. Finally to crown the work, M. Thiers —and I was not present—came to see it with the subject and repeated to her several times this wicked remark, 'M Ingres must be in love with you to have painted you that way.' But all this does not make me proud, and I do not feel that I have conveyed all the graces of that charming model."

== Description ==
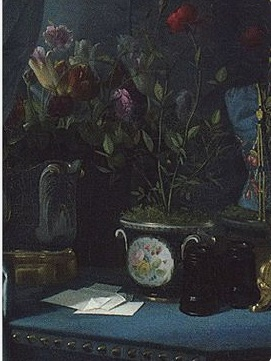
Detail

The painting is composed of pale blue, grey, brown, gold and white hues. Mme. de Broglie is shown fully frontal, looking out at the viewer with a demure expression, the intensity of which has often been compared to his later portrait of Madame Moitessier. Ingres reintroduces a motif first seen in his 1814 Portrait of Madame de Senonnes, that of the central figure reflected in a background mirror.

She wears a heavily folded, cold grey-blue satin dress painted with the same hue as her eyes. Her hair is parted and topped with a crimson ribbon at the back. The dresser before the mirror contains a variety of writing materials, pots and flowers, and a lavishly decorated oriental vase. The central motif of both the final painting and its predecessors is her raised left-hand index finger, coyly placed by her mouth, and her sinuous, unnaturally elongated right arm.

The painting was exhibited at the 1846 Bonne-Nouvelle exhibition alongside Ingres' 1814 Grande Odalisque and 1842 Odalisque with Slave, where all three works were praised by the French poet Charles Baudelaire for their "voluptuousness"; after the show he described Ingres as the quintessential painter of women, and described such portraits as the artist's highest accomplishments.

== Provenance ==
The painting remained in the family's private possession for eighty years, though it was displayed publicly on occasion. Its first Paris exhibition in 1846 created "a storm of approval among her family and friends", Ingres wrote a friend. The portrait was subsequently exhibited in 1855, 1867, 1874, and 1910, and was engraved in 1889 and again in 1910; it was also circulated in photographed form.

Following the death of Paul-Gabriel d'Haussonville in 1924, his descendants sold the painting to offset estate taxes to art dealer Georges Wildenstein, from whom it was next acquired by the Frick Collection for $125,000 in 1927. It has been almost continuously on public display in New York since the opening of Henry Clay Frick's home as a museum in 1935. Unlike other works acquired directly by Frick, Comtesse d'Haussonville can be loaned and exhibited elsewhere.

== See also ==
- List of paintings by Jean-Auguste-Dominique Ingres

== Sources ==
- Betzer, Sarah. Ingres and the Studio: Women, Painting, History. Pennsylvania State University Press, 2002. ISBN 978-0-2710-4875-8
- Mongan, Agnes; Naef, Hans. Ingres Centennial Exhibition 1867–1967: Drawings, Watercolors, and Oil Sketches from American Collections. Greenwich, CT: Distributed by New York Graphic Society, 1967. OCLC 170576
- Rosenblum, Robert. Ingres. London: Harry N. Abrams, 1990. ISBN 978-0-300-08653-9
- Tinterow, Gary; Conisbee, Philip. Portraits by Ingres: Image of an Epoch. New York: Metropolitan Museum of Art, 1999. ISBN 978-0-300-08653-9
