= Gabriel Paul Othenin de Cléron, comte d'Haussonville =

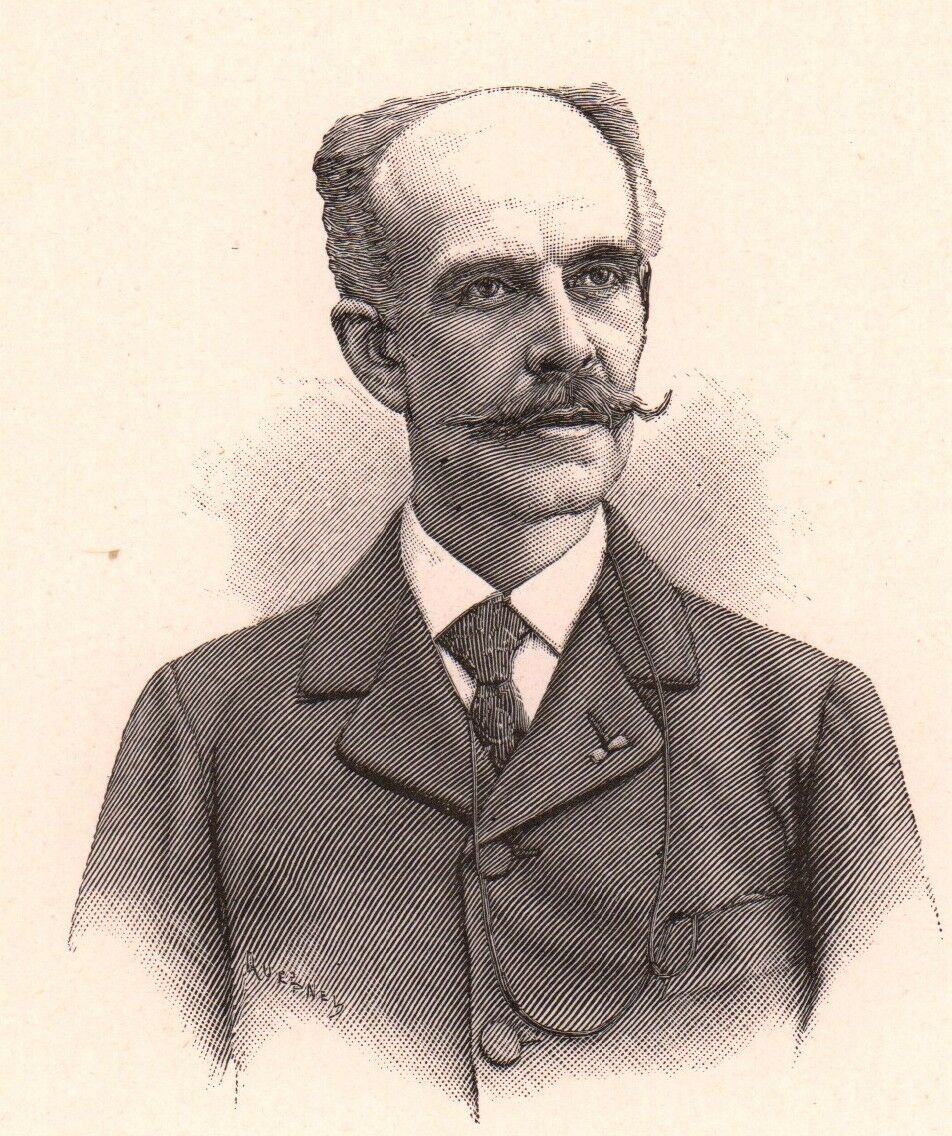
Gabriel Paul Othenin de Cléron, comte d'Haussonville.

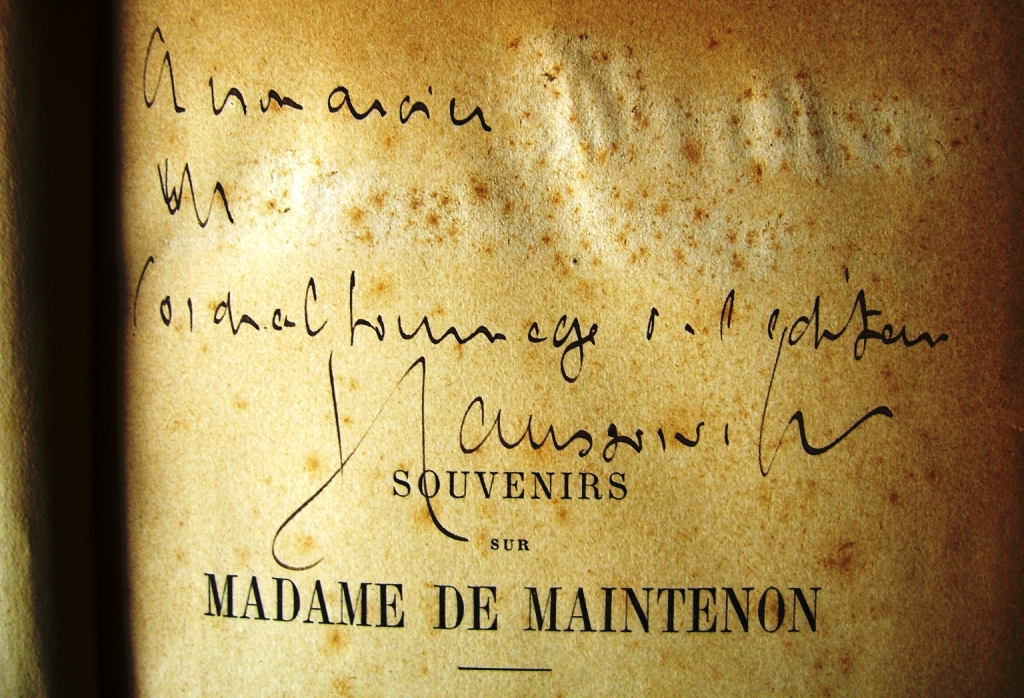
Signature of Gabriel Paul Othenin de Cléron, comte d'Haussonville, in a first edition of Souvenirs sur Mme de Maintenon

Gabriel Paul Othenin de Cléron, comte d'Haussonville (21 September 1843 – 1 September 1924) was a French politician and author.

== Biography ==
Born at Gurcy-le-Châtel (Seine-et-Marne), de Cléron was the son of Joseph Othenin Bernard de Cléron, comte d'Haussonville and Louise née Louise Albertine, princesse de Broglie.

De Cléron represented Seine-et-Marne in the National Assembly (1871) and voted with the Right Centre. Though he was not elected to the chamber of deputies he became the righthand man of his maternal uncle Albert, 4th duc de Broglie, in the attempted coup of May 16. His Les établissements pénitentiaires en France et aux colonies (1875) was crowned by the Académie française, of which he was admitted a member on January 26, 1888.

In 1891 the resignation of Henri Edouard Bocher from the administration of the Orleans estates led to the appointment of d'Haussonville as accredited representative of the comte de Paris in France. He at once set to work to strengthen the Orleanist party by recruiting from the smaller nobility the officials of the local monarchical committees. He established new Orleanist organs, and sent out lecturers with instructions to emphasize the modern and democratic principles of the comte de Paris; hut the prospects of the party were dashed in 1894 by the death of the comte de Paris.

In 1904 he was admitted to the Académie des sciences morales et politiques.

== Family ==
In 1865 d'Haussonville married Mlle Pauline d'Harcourt.

== Works ==
The comte d'Haussonville published:

- Sainte-Beuve, sa vie et ses œuvres (1875)
- Études biographiques et littéraires, 2 vol. (1879 and 1888)
- Le Salon de Mme Necker (1882, 2 vols.)
- Madame da La Fayette (1891)
- Madame Ackermann (1892)
- Le comte de Paris, souvenirs personnels (1895)
- La duchesse de Bourgogne et l’alliance savoyarde sous Louis XIV (4 vols., 1898–1903)
- Salaires et misères de femmes (1900)
- with G Hanotaux, Souvenirs de Mme de Maintenon (3 vols., 1902–1904)
- Après la séparation (1906)
- À l’Académie française et autour de l’Académie (1907)
- Femmes d’autrefois. Hommes d’aujourd’hui (1912)
- Ombres françaises et visions anglaises (1914)
- À Metz (1919)
