= Albertine, Baroness Staël von Holstein =

Baroness (1797–1838)

Albertine de Staël Holstein, Duchess de Broglie
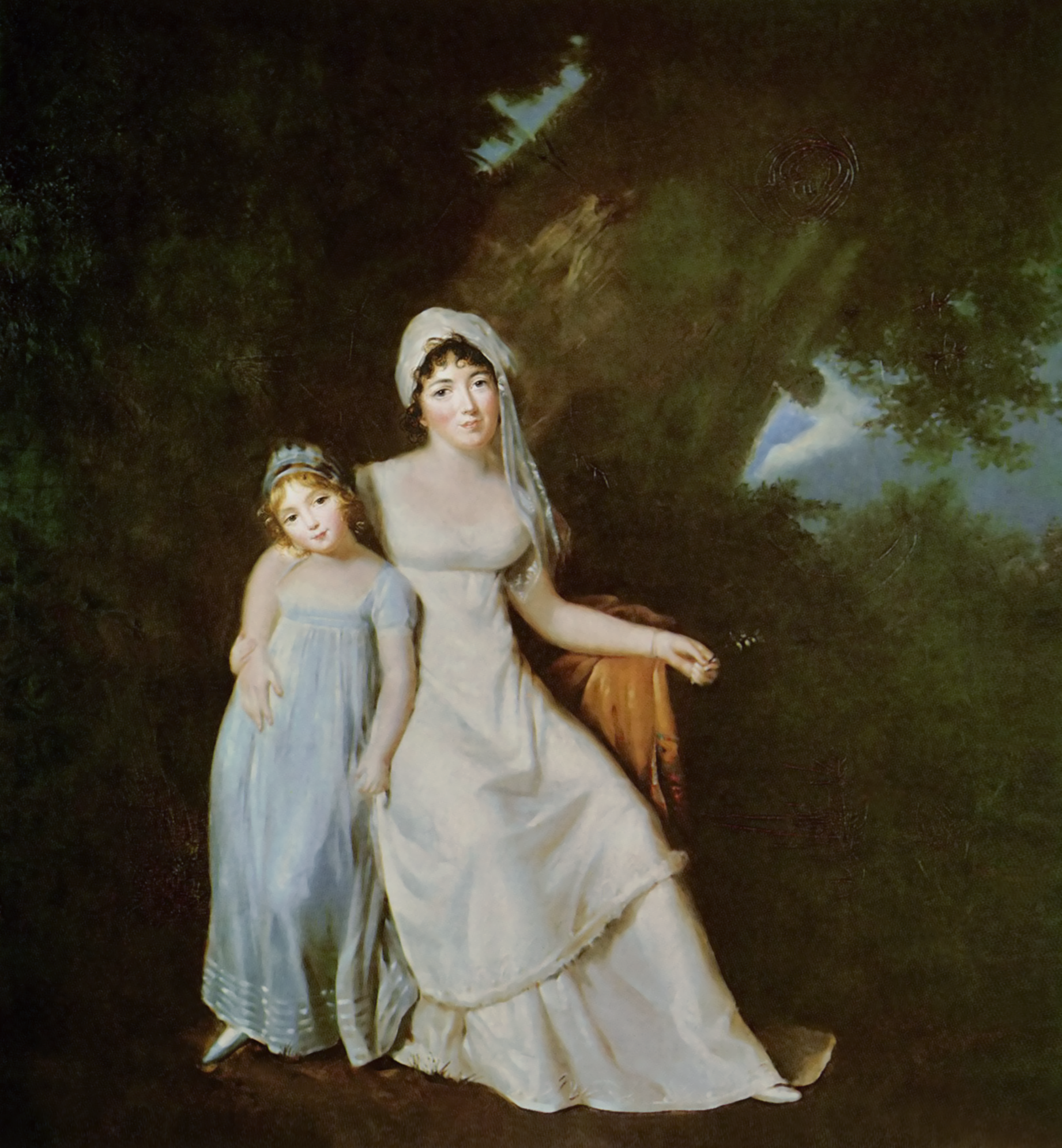
- Portrait of Albertine and her mother c. 1805
- Full name: Albertine Ida Gustavine
- Born: 8 June 1797; Paris, French First Republic
- Died: 22 September 1838 (aged 41); Coppet, Vaud, Switzerland
- Noble family: Staël von Holstein
- Spouses: Victor de Broglie, Duc de Broglie (m. 1816)
- Issue: Louise de Broglie; Albert de Broglie; Paul de Broglie
- Father: Baron Erik Magnus Staël-Holstein
- Mother: Germaine de Staël

Albertine Ida Gustavine, Baroness de Staël-Holstein or simply Albertine (8 June 1797– 22 September 1838), was the daughter of Erik Magnus Staël von Holstein and Madame de Staël, the granddaughter of Jacques Necker and Suzanne Curchod, wife to Victor de Broglie (1785–1870), and mother to Albert, a French monarchist politician, and Louise, a novelist and biographer. Her biological father may have been the author Benjamin Constant.

== Life ==
She married the Duc de Broglie in 1816. They had four children:

1. Pauline de Broglie (1 May 1817 - 22 December 1831), who died at the age of 14.
2. Louise Albertine de Broglie (25 May 1818 - 21 April 1882), who married Count Joseph d'Haussonville and became a writer.
3. Jacques Victor Albert de Broglie (13 June 1821 - 19 January 1901), who succeeded his father as fourth Duc de Broglie.
4. Auguste Théodore Paul de Broglie (June 18, 1834 – May 11, 1895), who became an abbot and a professor.

Albertine, still very much part of the de Staël circle, shared her grandfather's anglomania, and introduced her husband to the "erudite society that centred around that family." Victor de Broglie Souvenirs recall their married life and the political storms that surrounded it.

Her letters were collected and edited by her son Albert and published in French and in English by Robert Baird as Transplanted flowers, or memoirs of Mrs. Rumpff, daughter of John Jacob Astor, Esq. and the Duchess de Broglie, daughter of Madame de Stael (1846).
