= Louis de Carné =

French politician, journalist and historian (1804–1876)

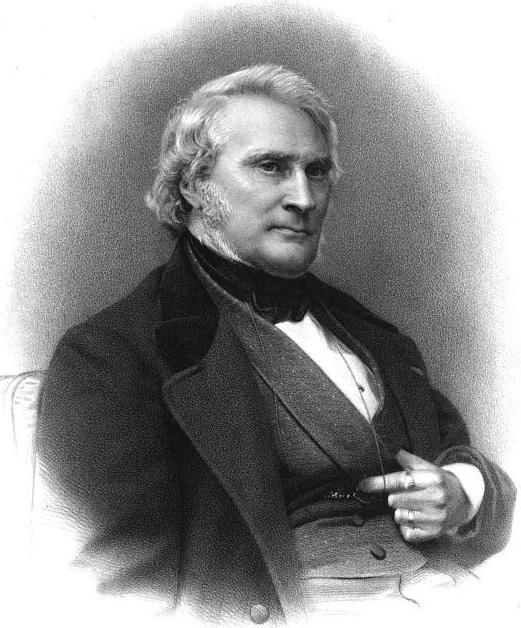

Louis-Marie de Carné (17 February 1804 in Quimper, Finistère – 11 February 1876 in Plomelin), comte de Carné was a French politician, journalist and historian.

== Biography ==
Founder of the newspaper le Correspondant in 1829, conseiller général for Finistère, député from 1839 to 1846, he was also a contributor to the Journal des débats and the Revue des deux mondes as well as one of the founders of the Société d'économie charitable and of the Société internationale des études pratiques d'économie sociale. Supported by the opponents of the Second French Empire (Montalembert, Dupanloup, Guizot), he was elected to the Académie française on 24 April 1863, on the third scrutiny, against Émile Littré.

He was president of the Société archéologique du Finistère until his death.

== Works ==
- Vues sur l'histoire contemporaine (1833)
- Guiscriff, scènes de la Terreur dans une paroisse bretonne, précédé d'une notice historique sur la chouannerie (1835)
- Des Intérêts nouveaux en Europe depuis la révolution de 1830 (1838)
- Du Gouvernement représentatif en France et en Angleterre (1841)
- Études sur les fondateurs de l'unité nationale en France (1842)
- Études sur l'histoire du gouvernement représentatif en France, de 1789 à 1848 (1855)
- Les Fondateurs de l'unité française : Suger, saint Louis, Duguesclin, Jeanne d'Arc, Louis XI, Henri IV, Richelieu, Mazarin. Études historiques (1856)
- La Monarchie française au dix-huitième siècle, étude historiques sur les règnes de Louis XIV et de Louis XV (1859)
- L'Europe et le second Empire (1865)
- Les États de Bretagne et l'administration de cette province jusqu'en 1789 (1868) - Son ouvrage fondamental [...] toujours apprécié aujourd'hui
- Souvenirs de ma jeunesse au temps de la Restauration (1872).
