= Victor de Broglie (1785–1870) =

French politician (1785–1870)

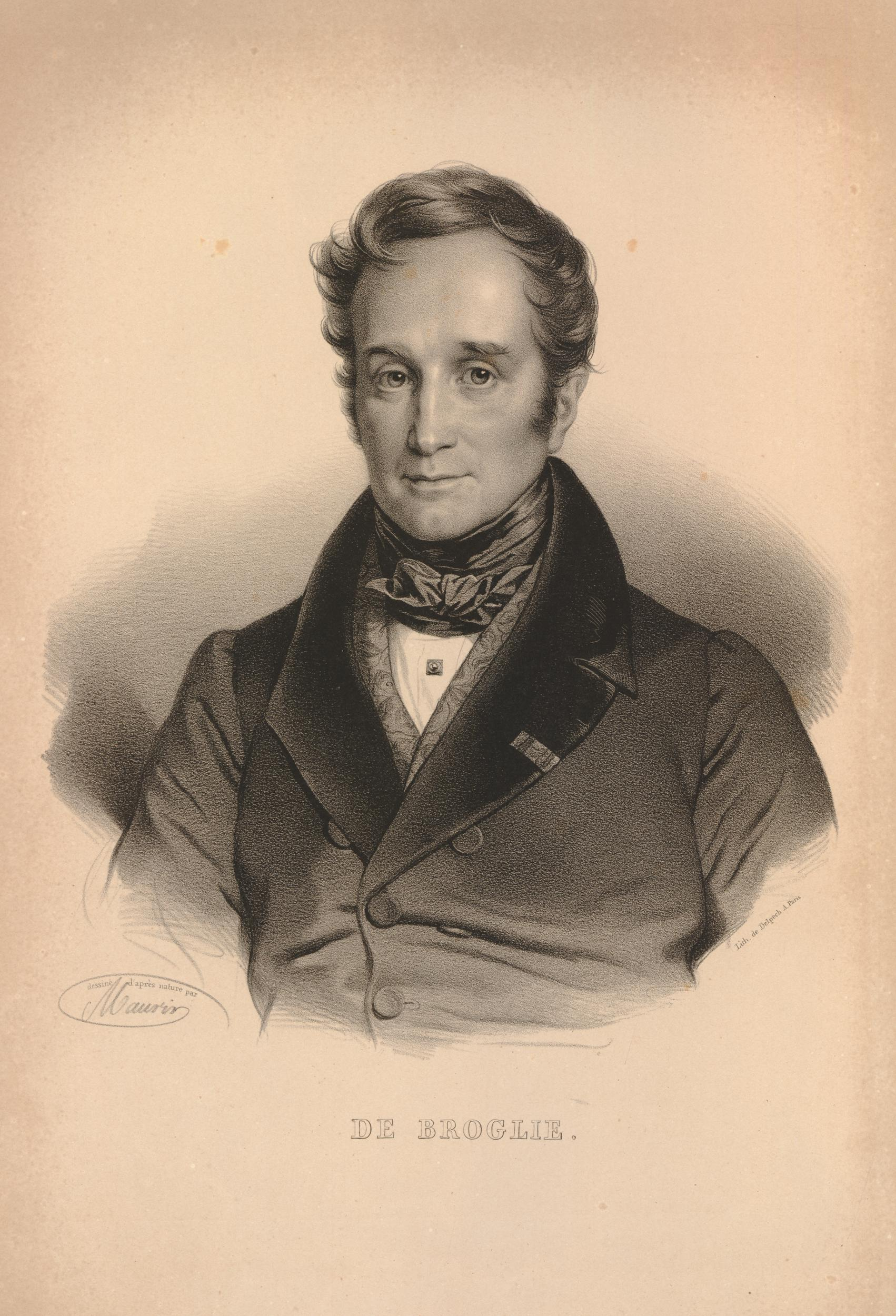
- Print of de Broglie potentially by Nicolas Eustache Maurin

Member of the Académie française
- In office 1 March 1855 – 25 January 1870
- Preceded by: Louis de Beaupoil
- Succeeded by: Prosper Duvergier de Hauranne

Member of the National Assembly for Eure
- In office 28 May 1849 – 3 December 1851
- Preceded by: Alfred Canel
- Succeeded by: Constituency abolished
- Constituency: Pont-Audemer

France Ambassador to the United Kingdom
- In office 1847–1848
- Appointed by: Louis Philippe I
- Preceded by: Louis de Beaupoil
- Succeeded by: Gustave de Beaumont

Prime Minister of France
- In office 12 March 1835 – 22 February 1836
- Monarch: Louis Philippe I
- Preceded by: Édouard Mortier
- Succeeded by: Adolphe Thiers

Personal details
- Born: Achille Léonce Victor Charles de Broglie; 28 November 1785 Paris, France
- Died: 25 January 1870 (aged 84) Paris, French Empire
- Party: Doctrinaires (1815–1830); Resistance Party (1830–1848); Party of Order (1848–1851)
- Spouse: Albertine de Staël-Holstein (m. 1816; died 1838)
- Children: Pauline; Louise; Albert; Paul
- Profession: Diplomat

Victor de Broglie, 3rd Duke of Broglie (French: [viktɔʁ də bʁɔj]; 28 November 1785 – 25 January 1870), briefly Victor de Broglie, was a French peer, statesman, and diplomat. He was the third duke of Broglie and served as president of the Council during the July Monarchy, from August 1830 to November 1830 and from March 1835 to February 1836. Victor de Broglie was close to the liberal Doctrinaires who opposed the ultra-royalists and were absorbed, under Louis Philippe I's rule, by the Orléanists.

== Biography ==
=== Early life ===
Victor de Broglie was born in Paris on 28 November 1785, the youngest child and only son of Charles-Louis-Victor, prince de Broglie, and grandson of Victor-François, 2nd duc de Broglie. While his grandfather emigrated, his parents were imprisoned during the Terror. His father was guillotined in 1794, but his mother, the former Countess Sophie de Rosen (Paris 10 Mar 1764 – Paris 31 Oct 1828) managed to escape to Switzerland, where she remained until the fall of Robespierre. She then returned to Paris with her children – three older daughters and one son– and lived there quietly until 1796, when she married the Marc-René-Voyer de Paulmy, marquis d'Argenson, grandson of Louis XV's minister of war. On his grandfather's death in 1804, Victor de Broglie became the third duc de Broglie.

Under the care of his stepfather, the young duke received a careful and liberal education and made his entrée into the aristocratic and literary society of Paris under the First French Empire. In 1821, his wife Albertine, the daughter of Erik Magnus Staël von Holstein (Albertine's biological father may have been Benjamin Constant) and Madame de Staël, gave birth to Albert, who would become the fourth duke of Broglie. His first-born daughter Louise would publish novels and biographies, and be famously painted by Ingres; another son, Auguste, would have an ecclesiastical and academic career.

=== Career ===
In 1809, de Broglie was appointed a member of the Council of State, over which the emperor Napoleon presided in person. In addition, he was sent by the Emperor on diplomatic missions, as an attaché, to various countries. Though he had never been in sympathy with the principles of the Empire, the duc de Broglie was not one of those who rejoiced at its downfall. In common with all men of experience and sense, he realized the danger to France of the rise to power of the forces of violent reaction. With Decazes and Richelieu, he saw that the only hope for a calm future lay in the reconciliation of the Restoration with the French Revolution. By the influence of his uncle, Amédée de Broglie, his right to a peerage had been recognized, and to his own great surprise he received, in June 1814, a summons from Louis XVIII to the Chamber of Peers. There, after the Hundred Days, he distinguished himself by his courageous defence of Marshal Ney, for whose acquittal he, alone of all the peers, both spoke and voted.

After this defiant act of opposition it was perhaps fortunate that his impending marriage gave him an excuse for leaving the country. On 15 February 1816, he was married at Leghorn to Albertine, baroness Staël von Holstein, the daughter of Madame de Staël. He returned to Paris at the end of the year, but took no part in politics until the elections of September 1816 broke the power of the ultraroyalists and substituted for the Chambre introuvable a moderate assembly composed of liberal Doctrinaires. De Broglie's political attitude during the years that followed is best summed up in his own words:

From 1812 to 1822 all the efforts of men of sense and character were directed to reconciling the Restoration and the Revolution, the old régime and the new France. From 1822 to 1827 all their efforts were directed to resisting the growing power of the counter-revolution. From 1827 to 1830 all their efforts aimed at moderating and regulating the reaction in a contrary sense.

=== The July Monarchy ===
During the last critical years of Charles X's reign, de Broglie identified himself with the liberal party – the Doctrinaires, among whom Royer-Collard and Guizot were the most prominent. The July Revolution of 1830 placed him in a difficult position; he knew nothing of the intrigues which placed Louis Philippe on the throne; the revolution accomplished, however, he was ready to uphold the fait accompli with characteristic loyalty, and on 9 August 1830 took office in the new government as President of the Council and Minister of Public Worship and Education. As he had foreseen, the ministry was short-lived, and on 2 November he was once more out of office.

During the critical time that followed, he consistently supported the principles which triumphed with the fall of Laffitte, representative of the center-left Parti du mouvement, and the accession to power of Casimir Perier, leader of the center-right Parti de la résistance, in March 1831. After the death of the latter and the insurrection of June 1832, De Broglie took office once more as Minister for Foreign Affairs (11 October).

His tenure of the foreign office was coincident with a very critical period in international relations. But for the sympathy of Britain under Palmerston, the July Monarchy would have been completely isolated in Europe, and this sympathy the aggressive policy of France in Belgium and on the Mediterranean coast of Africa had been in danger of alienating. The Belgian crisis had been settled, so far as the two powers were concerned, before De Broglie took office, but the concerted military and naval action for the coercion of the Dutch, which led to the French occupation of Antwerp, was carried out under his auspices. The good understanding of which this was the symbol characterized also the relations of De Broglie and Palmerston during the crisis of the first war of Muhammad Ali with the Porte, and in the affairs of the Spanish peninsula their common sympathy with constitutional liberty led to an agreement for common action, which took shape in the Quadruple Alliance between Britain, France, Spain and Portugal, signed at London on 22 April 1834. De Broglie had retired from office in the March preceding, and did not return to power until March of the following year, when he became head of the cabinet.

One of De Broglie's first act on his return was to have the National Assembly ratify the 4 July 1831 treaty with the United States, which it had rejected during his first term. His cabinet also voted the 1835 laws restricting freedom of press, following Giuseppe Fieschi's attempted assassination against Louis-Philippe in July 1835.

In 1836, the government having been defeated on a proposal to reduce the five percents tax, he once more resigned.

He had remained in power long enough to prove what honesty of purpose, experience of affairs, and common sense can accomplish when allied with authority. The debt that France and Europe owed him may be measured by comparing the results of his policy with that of his successors under not dissimilar circumstances. He had found France isolated and Europe full of the rumours of war; he left her strong in the English alliance and the respect of Liberal Europe, and Europe freed from the restless apprehensions which were to be stirred into life again by the attitude of Thiers in the Eastern Question and of Guizot in the affair of the Spanish Marriages.

From 1836 to 1848, De Broglie held almost completely aloof from politics, to which his scholarly temperament little inclined him, a disinclination strengthened by the death of his wife on 22 September 1838. His friendship for Guizot, however, induced him to accept a temporary mission in 1845, and in 1847 to go as French ambassador to London.

=== Second Republic and Second Empire ===
The revolution of 1848 was a great blow to him, for he realized that it meant the final ruin of the constitutional monarchy, in his view the political system best suited to France. He took his seat, however, in the republican National Assembly and in the Convention of 1848, and, as a member of the section known as the "Burgraves", fought against both socialism and what he foresaw as a coming autocratic reaction. He shared with his colleagues the indignity of the 2 December 1851 coup, and remained for the remainder of his life one of the bitterest enemies of the Second Empire, though he was heard to remark, with that caustic wit for which he was famous, that the empire was the government which the poorer classes in France desired and the rich deserved.

The last twenty years of his life were devoted chiefly to philosophical and literary pursuits. Having been brought up by his stepfather in the sceptical opinions of the time, he gradually arrived at a sincere belief in the Christian religion. "I shall die," he said, "a penitent Christian and an impenitent Liberal".

His literary works, though few of them have been published, were rewarded in 1856 by a seat in the Académie française, replacing Louis de Beaupoil de Saint-Aulaire, and he was also a member of the Académie des sciences morales et politiques. In the labors of those learned bodies he took an active and assiduous part.

== Honours ==
- 1833: Grand cordon of the Order of Leopold.

== Works ==
Besides his Souvenirs, in 4 vols. (Paris, 1885–1888), the duc de Broglie left numerous works, of which only some have been published. Of these may be mentioned:

- Écrits et discours (3 vols., Paris, 1863);
- Le libre échange et l'impôt (Paris, 1879);
- Vues sur le gouvernement de la France (Paris, 1861).

This last was confiscated by the imperial government before publication.

== Notes ==
Political offices
Preceded by Henri Gauthier, comte de Rigny	Minister of Foreign Affairs; 12 March 1835 – 22 February 1836	Succeeded by Adolphe Thiers
French nobility
Preceded by Victor-François, 2nd duc de Broglie	Duc de Broglie; 1804–1870	Succeeded by Albert, 4th duc de Broglie
Cultural offices
Preceded by Louis de Beaupoil, Comte de Sainte-Aulaire	Seat 24; Académie française 1855–1870	Succeeded by Prosper Duvergier de Hauranne
