= Joseph d'Haussonville =

French historian and politician (1809–1884)

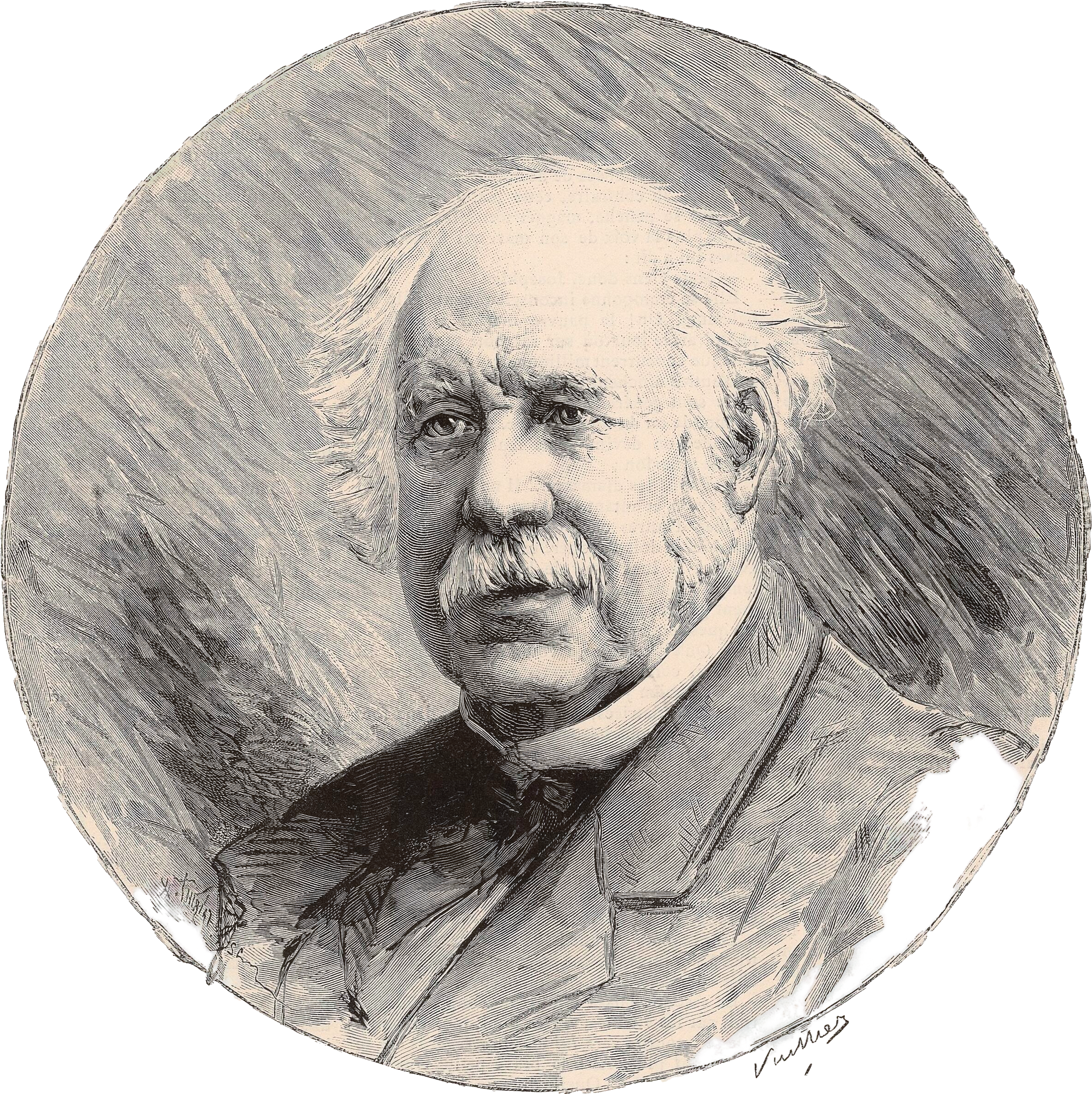
Joseph d'Haussonville

Joseph Othenin Bernard de Cléron, comte d'Haussonville (27 May 1809 – 28 May 1884), was a French politician and historian.

He was born in Paris. His grandfather had been grand louvetier of France; his father was Charles Louis Bernard de Cléron, comte d'Haussonville Comte Joseph had filled a series of diplomatic appointments at Brussels, Turin and Naples before he entered the chamber of deputies in 1842 for Provins. Under the Second Empire, he published a liberal anti-imperial paper at Brussels, Le Bulletin français, and in 1863 he actively supported the candidature of Prévost Paradol.

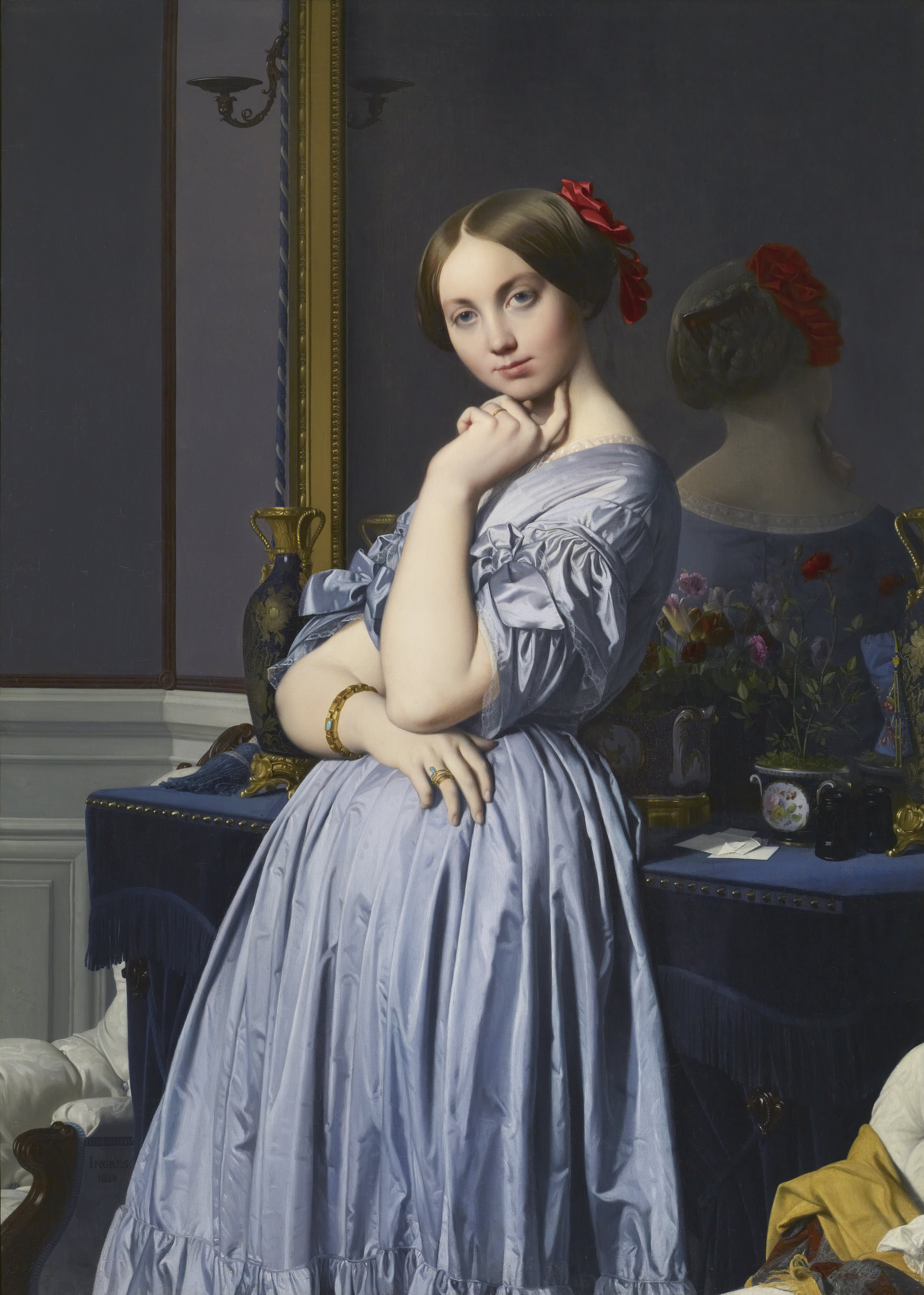
Louise de Broglie, Contesse d'Haussonville, wife of Joseph Othenin Bernard de Cléron, comte d'Haussonville, painted 1845 by Ingres

He was elected to the Académie française in 1869, in recognition of his historical writings, Histoire de la politique extérieure du gouvernement français de 1830 à 1848 (2 vols., 1850), Histoire de la réunion de la Lorraine à la France (5 vols., 1854-1859), L'église romaine et le premier empire 1800-1814 (5 vols., 1864-1879). In 1870 he published a pamphlet directed against the Prussian treatment of France, La France et la Prusse devant l'Europe, the sale of which was prohibited in Belgium at the request of King Wilhelm of Prussia.

He was the president of an association formed to provide new homes in Algeria for the inhabitants of Alsace-Lorraine who elected to retain their French nationality. In 1878 he was made a life-senator, in which capacity he allied himself with the Right Centre in defence of the religious associations against the anti-clericals. He died in Paris on 28 May 1884.

His wife Louise (1818-1882), a daughter of Duc Victor de Broglie, published in 1858 a novel Robert Emuret, followed by Marguerite de Valois reine de Navarre (1870), La Jeunesse de Lord Byron (1872), and Les Dernières Années de Lord Byron (1874). His son, Gabriel-Paul-Othenin, was also a politician and historian.

== See also ==
- Naciria (Algeria), formerly named Haussonvillers after Joseph d'Haussonville
