= Auguste-Théodore-Paul de Broglie =

French professor of apologetics and writer on apologetic subjects

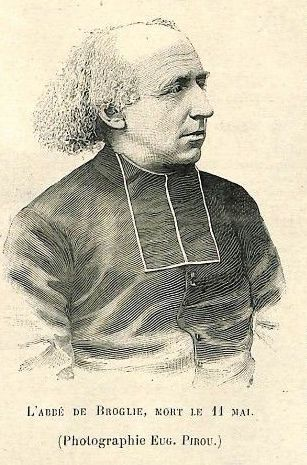
- Born: 18 June 1834; Auteuil, Seine, France
- Died: 11 May 1895 (aged 60); Paris, France

Abbé Auguste-Théodore-Paul de Broglie (June 18, 1834 – May 11, 1895) was professor of apologetics at the Institut Catholique in Paris, and writer on apologetic subjects.

He was the son of Achille-Victor, Duc de Broglie, and his wife, Albertine, baroness Staël von Holstein, a Protestant and the daughter of Madame de Staël. After the death of his mother, who died young, he was brought up by the Baroness Auguste de Staël, née Vernet. This aunt, although also a Protestant, exerted herself "to make a large-minded Christian of him in the Church to which she did not belong" (Monseigneur d'Hulst in Le Correspondant, 25 May 1895).

Broglie studied at the École Polytechnique, leaving in 1855. Still young, he entered the navy; he was appointed ensign in 1857 and soon after lieutenant. After a voyage to New Caledonia in which he came in contact with active missions, he felt himself called to the religious life. He entered the Seminary of Saint Sulpice in Paris in 1867. After completing his studies there he was ordained priest on 18 October 1870. He was named professor of apologetics at the Institut Catholique in 1879. His teaching, which included philosophical, theological, biblical and historical themes, were intended to defend the Catholic faith from perceived attacks from Positivism and Rationalism. He maintained the harmony and autonomy of the two spheres of knowledge, religion and reason.

== Works ==
In his numerous publications the Abbé de Broglie was always a faithful defender of Catholic dogma. At the time of his death, which resulted from the violence of an insane person he had taken under his protection, he was preparing a book on the agreement of reason and faith.

His most important work is Problèmes et conclusions de l'histoire des religions (Paris, 1886). Of his other writings, some of which were pamphlets or articles in reviews, the following may be mentioned:

- Le positivisme et la science expérimentale (2 vol., París 1880-81)
- Cours d’apologétique chrétienne (1883)
- La Morale évolutionniste (1885)
- La Morale sans Dieu (1886)
- La Réaction contre le positivisme (1894)
- Religion de Zoroastre et religion védique
- Le bouddhisme
- Religions neo-brahmaniques de l'Inde
- L'islamisme; La vraie définition de la religion
- La transcendence du christianisme
- L'histoire religieuse d'Israël
- Les prophètes et les prophéties, d'après les travaux de Kuenen
- L'idée de Dieu dans l'Ancien et le Nouveau Testament
- Le présent et l'avenir du catholicisme en France

Two posthumous publications, Religion et critique (1896) and Questions bibliques (1897) were edited by the Abbé Piat.
