= Portrait of Baronne de Rothschild =

Painting by Jean-Auguste-Dominique Ingres

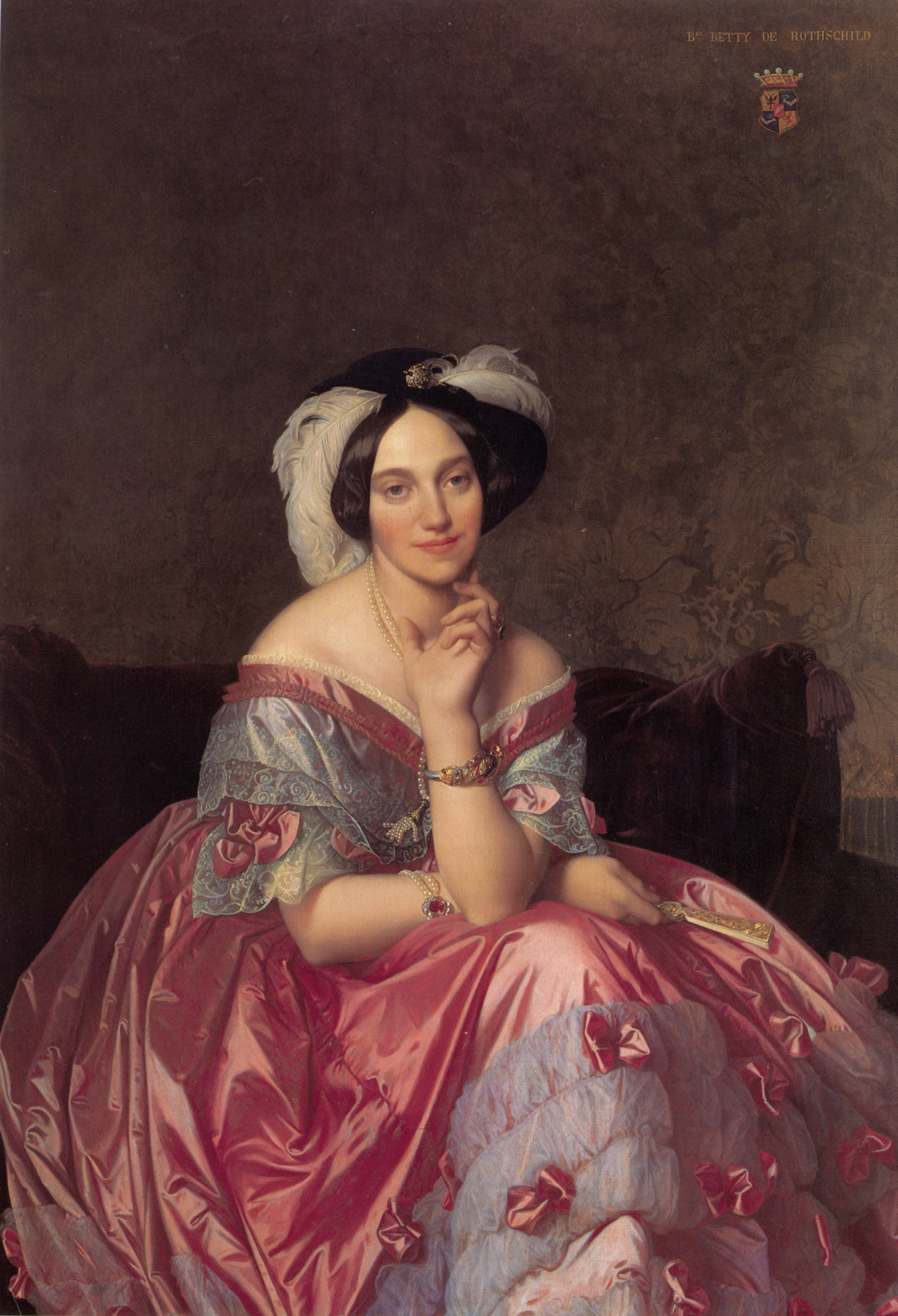
- Baronne de Rothschild, Rothschild Collection, Paris
- Artist: Jean-Auguste-Dominique Ingres
- Year: 1848
- Type: Oil painting
- Subject: Betty de Rothschild (1805–1886)
- Dimensions: 141.9 cm × 101 cm (55.9 in × 40 in)

Baronne de Rothschild is an 1848 portrait by the French Neoclassical artist Jean-Auguste-Dominique Ingres. The sitter, Betty de Rothschild (1805–1886) had married her paternal uncle banker James Mayer de Rothschild and was one of the wealthiest women in Europe, and one of the foremost Parisian patrons of the arts. Her beauty and elegance were widely known and celebrated and inspired Heinrich Heine's poem The Angel. For her portrait, which is painted in oil on canvas, Ingres sought to infuse symbols of her material wealth with the dignity, grace and beauty of Renaissance art, especially that of Raphael, while at the same time adhering to the command of line as practised by Jan van Eyck. It is this combination which, according to art historians, places Ingres so far apart from his early modernist contemporaries.

Betty de Rothschild's portrait is regarded as one of Ingres' most accomplished works and has been described as "perhaps the most sumptuous yet approachable image of mid-nineteenth-century opulence."

== Background ==
She first asked Ingres to paint her in 1841 when he was much sought after as a reluctant portraitist. His ambition lay in history painting which he believed was a higher form of art, while his living lay in commissions for the nobility. At this point he was financially comfortable and refused. After meeting her at a ball and finding her highly charming, he agreed to the commission. In a letter of 26 June 1842 to his friend Jean-Pierre-François Gilibert, Ingres wrote: "Tuesday, I have a definite sitting with Mme. de Rothschild, which came at the price of a dozen puerile and sincere letters. Long live portraits! may God damn them…!"

The painting was not completed for another six years: there were false starts, and progress was interrupted while he took time to work on other portraits – including his portrait of the late Ferdinand Philippe Henri the Duc d'Orleans who was killed in a carriage accident in 1842. Although Ingres had nearly finished Mme de Rothschild's head by February 1843, in June 1844 he made a new start. As the first version of the portrait is not known to survive, it is probable that Ingres scraped it down and painted the new version on top of it. He wrote in June 1847 that he had "barely finished Mme. de Rothschild, begun again better, and the portrait of Mme Moitessier." The painting was completed in 1848.

== Description ==
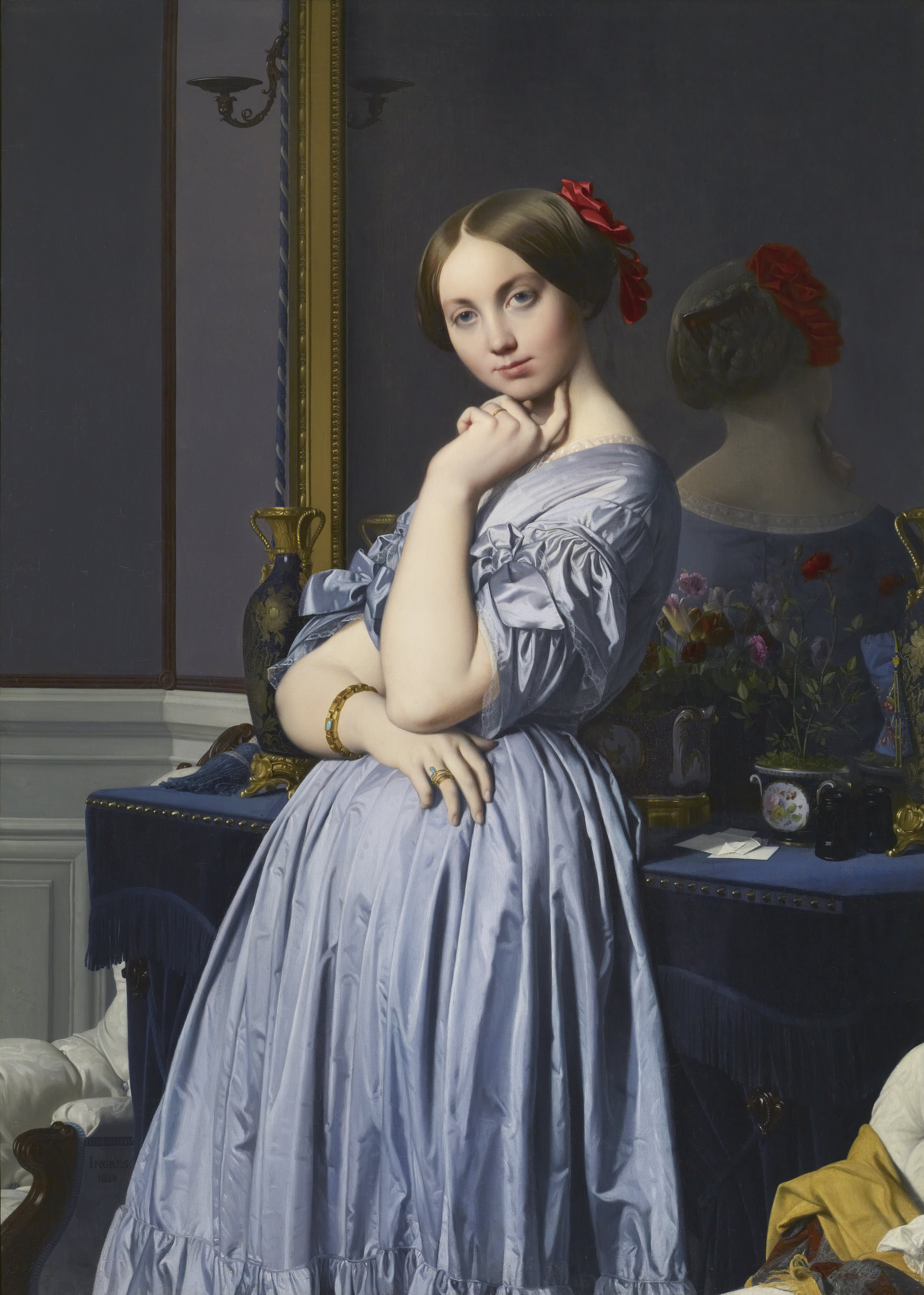
Louise de Broglie, Countess d'Haussonville, 1845. Among the similarities to the Rothschild portrait are her oval face, tightly parted hair, the position of her hands and fingers, and the coquettish expression. Note the anatomical absurdity in the proportion and curvature of d'Haussonville's arms and fingers.

Rothschild wears a pink satin evening dress with rows of ruching at the hem and lace frills at the collar and sleeves, trimmed with ribbon bows. Her hair is smoothed over her ears and she wears a black velvet toque decorated with ostrich plumes. She is seated on a red velvet sofa, with her arms and legs crossed in a relaxed manner. Ingres has captured her in this painting as if she were attending a soirée with friends.

She is positioned unusually low in the pictorial plane, giving her a vulnerability at odds with the obvious stature offered by the heraldic inscription and coat of arms at the top right. The portrait is dominated by two main elements: her wine-red satin robe and the charm of her facial expression and perfectly oval, almost idealised, face. While she looks out at the viewer with almost the same directness as Ingres' 1832 Portrait of Monsieur Bertin, the image is softened by the attractiveness of both her pose and dress. This warmth is contrasted by the sober and dull brown upper background, which serves to offset the splendour of the sitter.

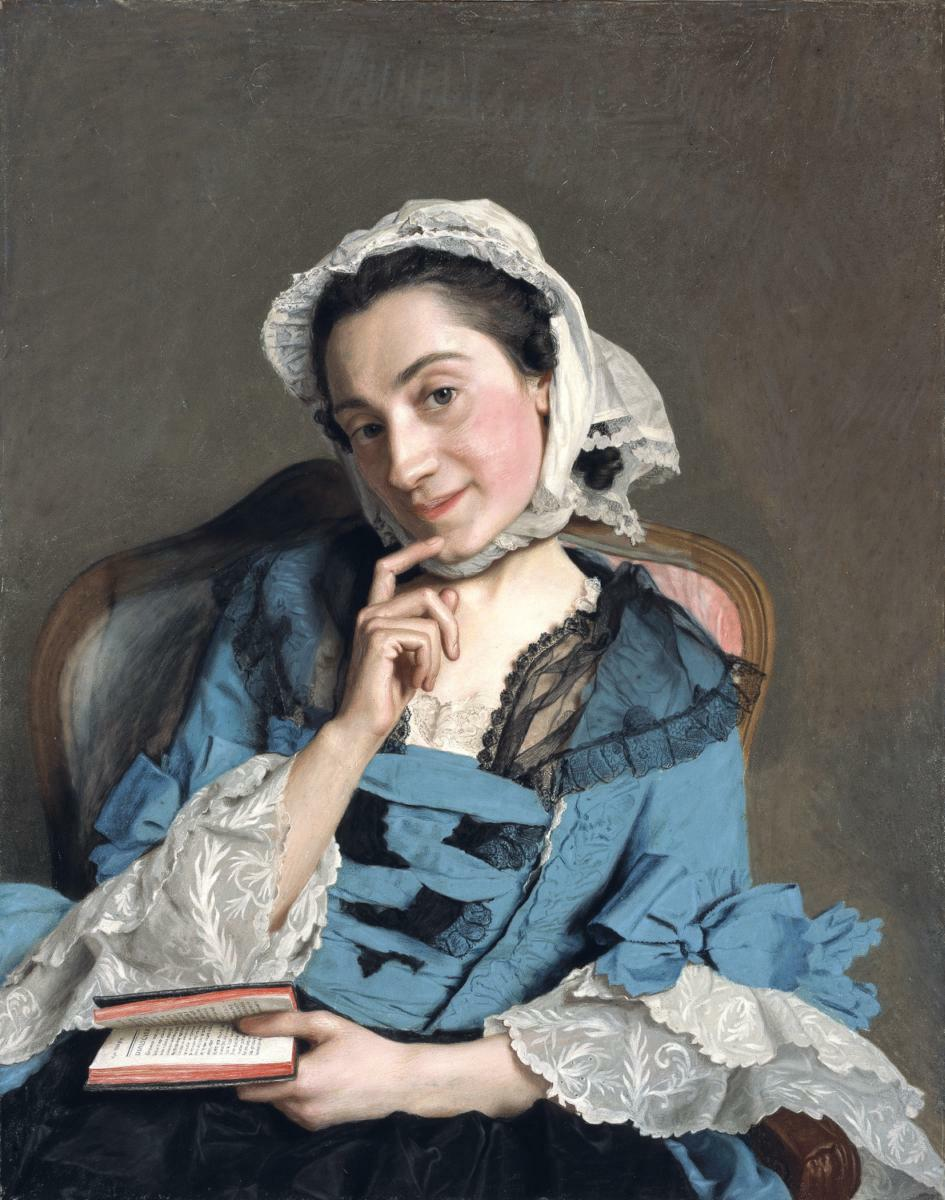
Jean-Étienne Liotard, Portrait of Louise d'Épinay, pastel, 1759

In contrast to the Bertin portrait, which required of Ingres a prolonged struggle to arrive at the final seated pose, Ingres apparently settled on the basic composition of the Rothschild portrait at the very first session. The arrangement of Rothschild's upper body may have been partly inspired by a pastel by the Swiss artist Jean-Étienne Liotard, the Portrait of Louise d'Épinay (1759), which Ingres is known to have especially admired. The liveliness of Ingres' portrait is enhanced by the casual way the sitter leans forward over her crossed legs. According to the art historian Aileen Ribiero, "Madame de Rothschild's pose – the way she crosses her legs so that the shape of her knee can clearly be seen – might have been regarded as rather risqué, if we are to believe the etiquette books", which at the time cautioned that a woman should not cross her legs when seated.

Many critics have noted Ingres' unusual use of light in this work; the shadows on her dress are rendered flatter than the lit areas of cloth, yet paradoxically lie just above them on the surface of the canvas. Typically, Ingres does not adhere to an anatomically correct representation of the visible parts of her body, which appear almost boneless and unusually bent and curved.

== History ==
The portrait was hung in Betty's salon until her death in 1886. It was lent in 1867 to the posthumous Ingres exhibition in Paris, but has subsequently been exhibited publicly only twice. During the German occupation of France during World War II, it was confiscated from Mme de Rothschild's grandchildren as Jewish property. In June 1946, it was returned to the family, and in that year, it was exhibited in Paris along with other repatriated works. It was displayed in the centennial exhibition of Ingres' work in 1967–68 at the Petit Palais in Paris.

== Bibliography ==
- Arikha, Avigdor (1986). J.A.D. Ingres: Fifty Life Drawings from the Musée Ingres at Montauban. Houston: The Museum of Fine Arts. ISBN 0-89090-036-1
- Garb, Tamar.The Painted Face, Portraits of Women in France 1814-1914. Yale University Press, 2007. ISBN 978-0-300-11118-7
- Jover, Maneul. Ingres. Harry N. Abrams, 1990. ISBN 0-8109-3451-5
- Ockman, Carol. "Two Eyebrows à l’orientale: Ethnic Stereotyping in Ingres’s Baronne de Rothschild". The Jewish Quarterly, 1992
- Ribeiro, Aileen. Ingres in Fashion: Representations of Dress and Appearance in Ingres's Images of Women. New Haven and London: Yale University Press, 1999. ISBN 0-300-07927-3
- Rifkin, Adrian. Ingres Then, and Now. New York: Routledge, 2000. ISBN 0-415-06698-0
- Rosenblum, Robert. Ingres. London: Harry N. Abrams, 1990. ISBN 0-300-08653-9
- Strumingher, Laura. The life & legacy of Baroness Betty de Rothschild. Peter Lang Publishing, 2006. ISBN 0-8204-7885-7
- Tinterow, Gary; Conisbee, Philip; Naef, Hans. Portraits by Ingres: Image of an Epoch. New York: Harry N. Abrams, 1999. ISBN 0-8109-6536-4
