= Le Correspondant =

- Categories: Opinion press
- Frequency: Weekly (1829–1831); Monthly (1843–1868); Biweekly (1869–1937)
- Founder: Louis de Carné, Edmond de Cazalès, Camille-Augustin de Meaux
- First issue: March 1829
- Final issue: 1937
- Country: France
- Based in: Paris
- Language: French

Le Correspondent was a French Catholic review, founded in March 1829 by Louis de Carné, Edmond de Cazalès, and Camille-Augustin de Meaux. The motto of this moderately royalist Catholic review was "Liberté civile et religieuse par tout l’univers" ("Civil and religious liberty throughout the universe"). Publication ceased in 1831 but was revived in 1843 as a monthly review under the direction of Edmond Wilson and Victor-Amédée Waille (1798–1876). Jean Luglien de Jouenne d'Esgrigny was one of its initial shareholders.

After a period of dormancy, it was relaunched in 1855 by Charles de Montalembert as a Catholic opposition organ to the Second Empire and the journal L'Univers by Louis Veuillot. Le Correspondent became a platform for liberal Catholics and moderate royalists concerned about the almost complete alignment of the French Church with imperial authority and opposed to reactionary theories promoted by the pontifical authorities.

== Editorial Committee ==
The editorial committee included Montalembert, the Comte de Falloux, Albert de Broglie, journalist Charles Lenormant, Augustin Cochin, and Théophile Foisset. Key contributors included clergymen Félix Dupanloup and Henri Lacordaire, as well as former ministers Abel-François Villemain and Saint-Marc Girardin.

Notable publications in Le Correspondent include Lacordaire's 1856 tribute to Frédéric Ozanam, who died in 1853, and his "Letters to a Young Man on Christian Life." Albert de Broglie contributed a study on "The Church and the Roman Empire in the Fourth Century," while Montalembert published excerpts from The Monks of the West.

Armand de Melun and Augustin Cochin addressed social issues, helping define the emerging social Catholic movement.

== Suspension and Final Years ==
Le Correspondent was suspended on September 10, 1870, following the death of Montalembert and the establishment of the Third Republic. It resumed publication on June 25, 1871, continuing until 1937, when it was absorbed by the Jesuit French review Études.
