= Louis de Beaupoil de Saint-Aulaire =

French politician

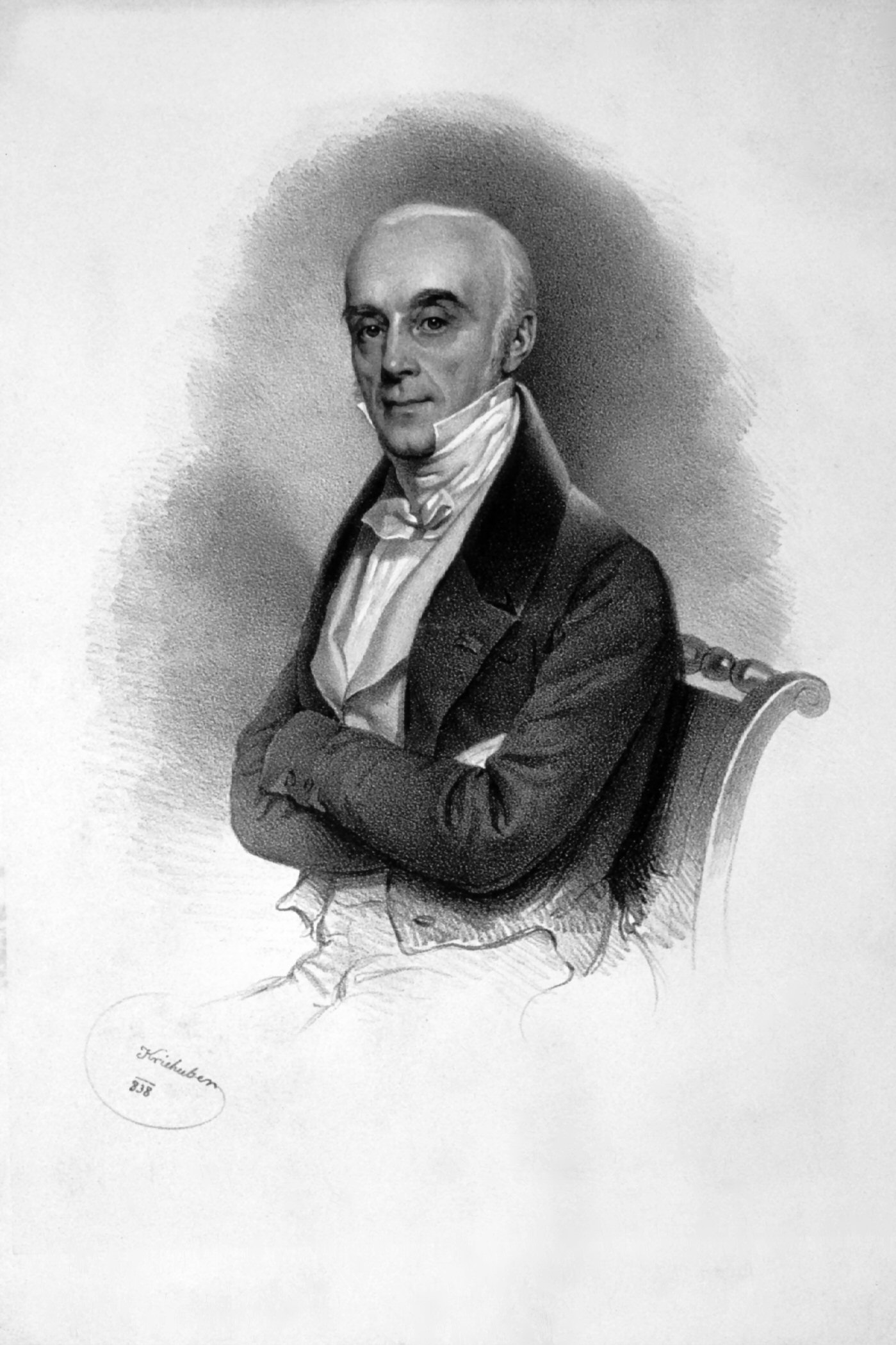
Louis de Beaupoil de Saint-Aulaire, Lithograph by Josef Kriehuber, 1838

Coat of arms of the Beaupoil de Saint-Aulaire family

Louis-Clair de Beaupoil, comte de Saint-Aulaire (9 April 1778, in Baguer-Pican – 13 November 1854, in Paris) was a French politician.

== Life ==
After attending school at the École des ponts et chaussées and polytechnique (from which he graduated in 1794), he served as chamberlain to Napoleon I of France, then prefect of the Meuse in 1813 and of Haute-Garonne in 1814. He was elected to the Chambre des Députés in 1815, and reelected from the Gard département in 1818, 1822 and 1827, but beaten in the elections of 1829. After that, he was appointed French ambassador to Rome (1832–1831), Vienna (1832–1841), and London (1841). He was elected a member of the Académie Française in 1841.

== Works ==
- Histoire de la Fronde (History of the Fronde, 1827)
- Considération sur la Démocratie (Consideration on Democracy, 1850)
- Les derniers Valois, les Guises et Henri IV (The last of the house of Valois, the Guises and Henry IV, 1854)
- Translation of Goethe's Faust (1823)

== Sources ==
- Biography on https://web.archive.org/web/20101224115843/http://www.assemblee-nationale.fr/index.asp
