= Erik Magnus Staël von Holstein =

Swedish diplomat, soldier and courtier (1749–1802)

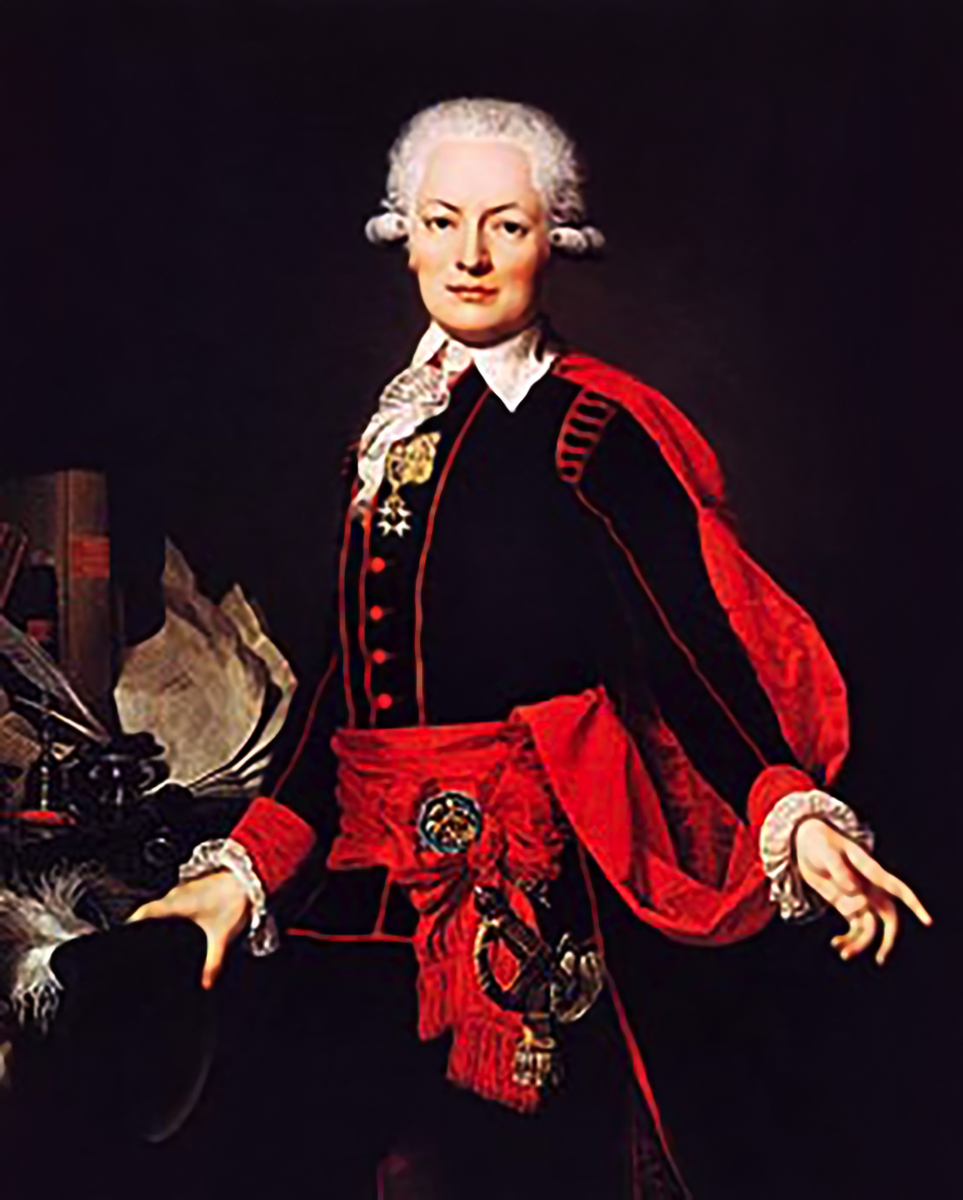
- Born: 25 October 1749; Loddby, Sweden
- Died: 9 May 1802 (aged 52); Poligny, Jura, France
- Resting place: Coppet, Switzerland
- Spouse: Anne Louise Germaine Necker (m. 1786)
- Parent: Baron Mathias Gustav Staël von Holstein
- Family: Staël von Holstein

Baron Erik Magnus Staël von Holstein (25 October 1749 – 9 May 1802) was a Swedish diplomat and courtier, best known as Sweden's ambassador to France during the French Revolution, and as the husband of Madame de Staël.

== Early life and career to 1788 ==
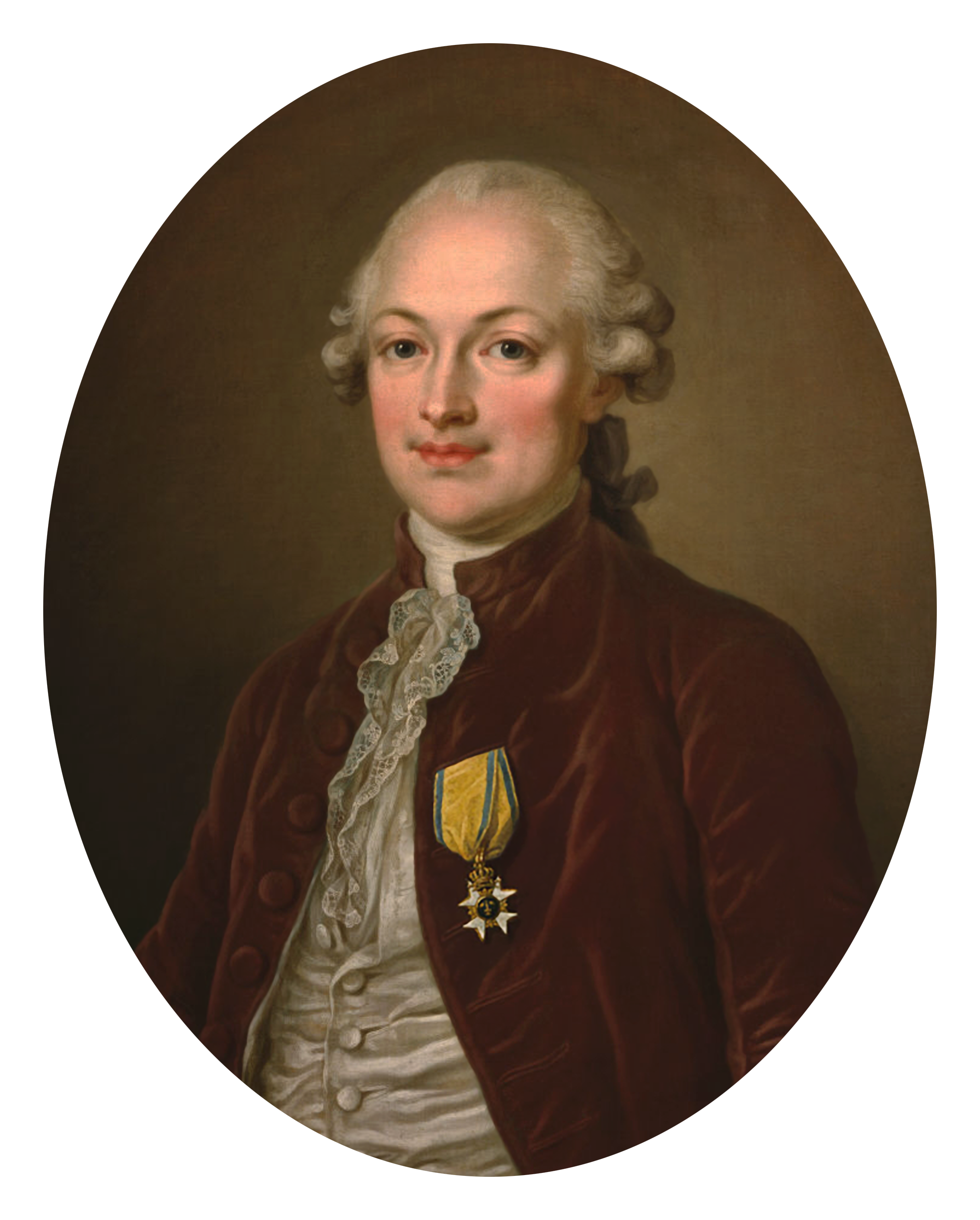
Erik Magnus Staël von Holstein in 1796 by Ulrika Pasch

Erik Magnus was born on 25 October 1749 at Loddby in Östergötland, the seventh child of Baron Mathias Gustav Staël von Holstein, a scion of an ancient noble family, and a grandnephew of the Swedish field marshal George Bogislaus Staël von Holstein. He began his career as a staff ensign in the Östergötland Infantry Regiment. In 1772, as a reward for his part in Gustav III's coup d'état, he was made a knight of the Order of the Sword and promoted lieutenant in the army; he became a lieutenant in the Södermanland Regiment in 1773 and a staff lieutenant in 1778.

In 1776 Staël travelled abroad hoping to make his fortune in British service during the American Revolutionary War, applying to the king for a captain's commission that would not arrive for four years. In the meantime he began cultivating connections in Paris, where an expensive lifestyle left him deeply in debt but won him powerful patrons in Gustav III's circle, including the countesses de La Marck and de Boufflers, and Queen Marie Antoinette herself. Through their influence he obtained an attaché position there, was appointed chamberlain to Gustav III's consort, Queen Sophia Magdalena, in 1778, and secretary at the Swedish embassy that same year, serving under the ambassador, Gustaf Philip Creutz. When the captain's commission finally arrived in 1780, he had already abandoned the British plan for his position at the legation.

When Creutz was recalled in February 1783 to head Sweden's foreign office, the king chose Staël to succeed him; Creutz left Paris in May, and Staël, after a brief initial period as chargé d'affaires, was received as minister plenipotentiary at the end of July. During this period he also negotiated the cession of Saint Barthélemy to Sweden and supported a proposal by William Bolts for a Swedish colony in the eastern Indian Ocean. By September 1784 he was already being formally addressed as ambassador in American diplomatic correspondence. The post became permanent only as part of his 1786 marriage settlement so that the impoverished Swedish nobleman would have the standing to become son-in-law to the wealthy financier Jacques Necker.

After several years of formal negotiation, brokered by the Countess de Boufflers and Marie Antoinette, Staël married Anne Louise Germaine Necker on 21 January 1786, receiving a dowry of 650,000 livres and the Order of the Polar Star. One condition of the settlement was the formal legitimation of the baronial title Staël had assumed on his arrival in Paris; this was not granted until 1788. Although his debts were meant to be settled through the marriage, he failed to fully disclose them and remained chronically unreliable in financial matters, leaving his finances troubled for the rest of his life. The marriage itself, brokered for advantage on both sides, was largely loveless though not acrimonious; Baron and Madame de Staël pursued other relationships and were often at odds politically, but remained on friendly terms.

== Ambassador during the Revolution (1791–1799) ==
As the French Revolution progressed, both Staël and, especially, his wife became known for sympathy toward the revolutionary cause, to Gustav III's displeasure; at the end of 1791 Staël was recalled to Sweden under the guise of a leave of absence. Gustav III's assassination in March 1792, which occurred around the time of Staël's arrival in Stockholm, opened new opportunities for him: an interest in order-mysticism had connected him to the new holders of power, the regent Duke Charles and his favourite Gustaf Adolf Reuterholm. Having resigned his army commission, Staël returned to Paris in 1792 carrying secret commissions from the duke and Reuterholm. As revolutionary violence escalated that year, Germaine used the embassy's diplomatic status to shelter friends threatened by the mob, fleeing the city herself only the day before the September Massacres began.

Acting in this informal capacity, Staël negotiated three agreements in quick succession: a defensive and subsidy alliance with France on 17 May 1793, never ratified; a Swedish-Danish neutrality pact on 27 March 1794; and a further Swedish-French alliance on 14 September 1795. Under the 1793 alliance, he attempted to save his former patroness, Marie Antoinette, by proposing that the regent petition the French government for her release, but the duke does not appear to have pursued it. To help secure the 1795 alliance, Staël appeared before the National Convention on 23 April 1795, exceeding his instructions to act as ambassador, and formally recognised the French Republic on Sweden's behalf, a step that caused a sensation and made Sweden the first monarchy to do so since the execution of Louis XVI. Under authorisation from the regent, he disbursed 100,000 livres, which he had borrowed in his own name, as payments to French officials to secure the alliance.

The alliance collapsed in the summer of 1796 amid the breakdown of Gustav IV Adolf's planned marriage to a Russian grand duchess; Staël was made to leave Paris that August and was formally dismissed from the ambassadorship in November. When the French subsidy payments tied to the alliance were halted, the regent never reimbursed the 100,000 livres; having already surrendered evidence of the regent's own improprieties in the 1793 negotiations, Staël had no leverage left to compel repayment, and fell into severe financial distress as a result.

The diplomatic rupture between Sweden and Russia that followed the failed royal marriage left the young Gustav IV Adolf open to a rapprochement with France, an opening Madame de Staël's influential French connections, particularly the foreign minister Talleyrand, used to press for her husband's reinstatement. Against his own wishes, the king was forced to agree to this in December 1797. When France was slow to reciprocate by restoring relations, Staël was tasked with the resulting negotiations, but not with the rank of ambassador: he served as commissionnaire plénipotentiaire from February 1798 and ministre plénipotentiaire from April 1798. His position became untenable when France insisted on sending an ambassador, rather than a minister, to represent itself in Sweden, breaching the principle of reciprocity, and appointed someone personally disagreeable to the king. Staël requested his resignation, which was granted immediately on 13 July 1799.

== Death ==
By the end of his diplomatic career Staël was, by contemporary accounts, broken in body and spirit, and unhappily married; in 1798 he had sought a legal separation from Germaine, who, after his 1796 dismissal, secured a separation of property between them. He depended for his livelihood on support from his father-in-law and his wife. In early 1802, Staël fell ill, and his wife invited him to the Necker family estate of Coppet in the hope that a nearby spa would aid his recovery. He suffered a stroke on the journey and died on the night of 8 May 1802, with his wife at his side; though they had never been close, his death affected her greatly, and she had him buried at Coppet.

== Personal life ==
Contemporaries, including his wife, described Staël as handsome, charming, kind-hearted, and cultured, with a deep knowledge of history, wine, and politics, though also weak-willed and prone to poor self-control. Abigail Adams, who accompanied her husband John Adams during his time as a US minister to France, thought him the most agreeable man she had met there. In his time he was acknowledged as a diplomat of great talent, but he was ultimately destined to be overshadowed by the brilliance of his wife.

=== Honours ===
- Knight of the Order of the Sword (1772), for his role in Gustav III's coup.
- Order of the Polar Star (1788)
- Baronial title formally legitimated in 1788, as a condition of his marriage settlement.

== Children ==
- Gustava Sofia Magdalena, born 1787, died 1789 at the age of two.
- Gustava Hedvig, born 1789, died in infancy.
- Ludvig August, born on 1 September 1790. Died in France in 1827, therefore ending this line of the family. Married 1827 to Adèle Vernet. He was said to have been the biological son of the Comte de Narbonne (1755-1813), himself the reputed unacknowledged illegitimate son of King Louis XV.
- Mattias Albert, born on 2 October 1792. Ensign in the Cavalry. Killed in a duel on 12 July 1813 at Buchtenberg, in Mecklenburg. Possibly the son of the Comte de Narbonne as well.
- Albertine Ida Gustavine, born 8 June 1797, died in Paris on 28 September 1838. Married on 20 February 1816 in Pisa to the French Foreign Minister, Victor de Broglie. Her biological father may have been Benjamin Constant.
