= Albert de Broglie, 4th Duke of Broglie =

French politician (1821–1901)

Albert de Broglie
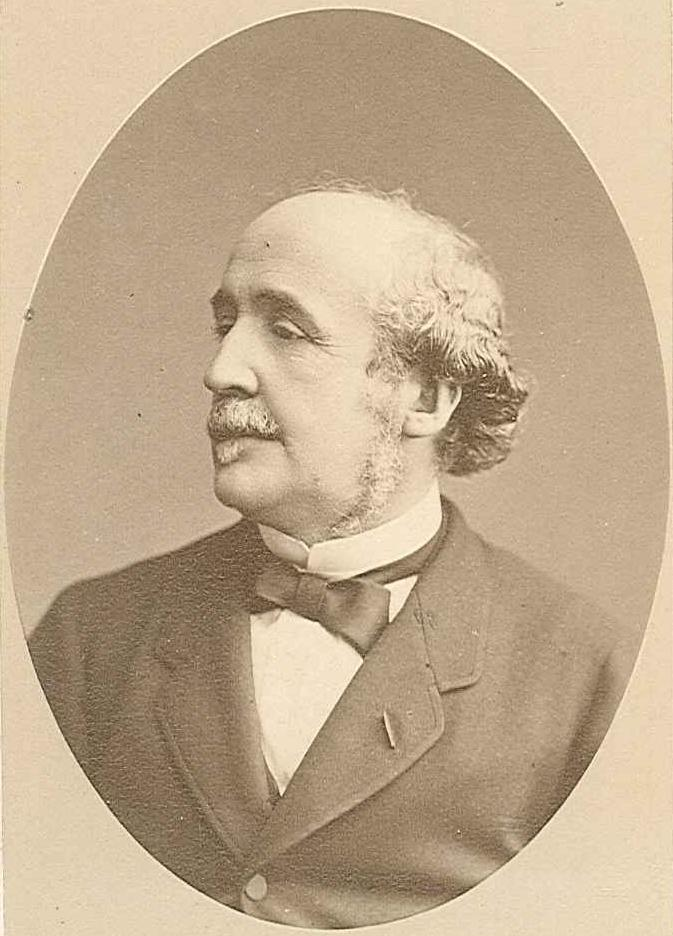

Prime Minister of France
- In office 17 May 1877 – 23 November 1877
- President: Patrice de MacMahon
- Preceded by: Jules Simon
- Succeeded by: Gaëtan de Rochebouët
- In office 24 May 1873 – 22 May 1874
- President: Patrice de MacMahon
- Preceded by: Jules Dufaure
- Succeeded by: Ernest Courtot de Cissey

Personal details
- Born: 13 June 1821 Paris, Seine, Kingdom of France
- Died: 19 January 1901 (aged 79) Paris, Seine, Third Republic of France
- Party: Orléanist

Arms de Broglie

Albert de Broglie, 4th Duke of Broglie (French: [viktɔʁ də bʁɔj]; 13 June 1821 – 19 January 1901) was a French monarchist politician, diplomat and writer (of historical works and translations).

Broglie twice served as Prime Minister of France, first from May 1873 to May 1874, and again from May to November 1877.

== Biography ==
Jacques Victor Albert de Broglie was born in Paris, France, the eldest son of Victor, 3rd duc de Broglie, a liberal statesman of the July Monarchy, and Albertine, baroness Staël von Holstein, the fourth child of Madame de Staël. He was therefore the great-grandson of Jacques Necker.

After a brief diplomatic career at Madrid and Rome, upon the revolution of 1848 Albert de Broglie withdrew from public life and devoted himself to literature. He had already published a translation of the religious system of Leibniz (1846). He now at once made his mark by his contributions to the Revue des deux mondes and the Orleanist and clerical organ Le Correspondant. These, and other contributions, brought him the succession to Lacordaire's seat in the Académie française in 1862, joining his father in this august society.

In 1870 he succeeded his father as the 4th duc de Broglie, having previously been styled prince de Broglie. In the following year he was elected to the National Assembly for the département of the Eure, and a few days later (on 19 February) was appointed French Ambassador to London. After his negotiations concerning the commercial treaties between Britain and France were met with criticism he resigned as ambassador in March 1872 and took his seat in the Assembly, where he became the leader of the royalist campaign against President Thiers.

When Thiers was replaced by Marshal Mac-Mahon, Broglie was appointed Prime Minister and Foreign Minister in May 1873. On 26 November, after the passing of the Septennate, the government was restructured and Broglie exchanged the Foreign with the Interior Ministry. His conservative policies roused the bitter hatred of the Republicans, while his attempts to reach a compromise between the rival claimants to the monarchy alienated both the Legitimists and the Bonapartists.

The result was the fall of the cabinet on 16 May 1874. Three years later (on 16 May 1877) he was entrusted with the formation of a new Cabinet, with the object of appealing to the country and securing a conservative majority in the chamber. While the conservatives increased their share of the vote, the election nevertheless confirmed a decisive Republican majority. De Broglie was defeated in his own constituency and resigned on 20 November.

Defeated again in 1885, he abandoned politics and reverted to his historical work, publishing a series of historical studies and biographies. He died in Paris on 19 January 1901, aged 79.

=== 1st Ministry (25 May – 26 November 1873) ===
Portfolio	Holder	Party
Vice-President of the Council of Ministers	Albert de Broglie	Royalist
Ministers
Minister of Foreign Affairs	Albert de Broglie	Royalist
Minister of the Interior	Charles Beulé	Royalist
Minister of Justice	Jean Ernoul	Royalist
Minister of Finance	Pierre Magne	Royalist
Minister of War	General François Charles du Barail	Bonapartiste
Minister of the Navy and Colonies	Admiral Charles de Dompierre d'Hornoy	None
Minister of Public Education, Fine Arts and Worship	Anselme Batbie	None
Minister of Public Works	Alfred Deseilligny	Royalist
Minister of Agriculture and Commerce	Marie Roullet de La Bouillerie	Royalist

=== 2nd Ministry (26 November 1873 – 22 May 1874) ===
Portfolio	Holder	Party
Vice-President of the Council of Ministers	Albert de Broglie	Royalist
Ministers
Minister of the Interior	Albert de Broglie	Royalist
Minister of Justice	Octave Depeyre	Royalist
Minister of Finance	Pierre Magne	Royalist
Minister of Foreign Affairs	Louis Decazes	Royalist
Minister of War	General François Charles du Barail	Bonapartiste
Minister of the Navy and Colonies	Admiral Charles de Dompierre d'Hornoy	None
Minister of Public Education, Fine Arts and Worship	Oscar Bardi de Fourtou	Royalist
Minister of Public Works	Roger de Larcy	Royalist
Minister of Agriculture and Commerce	Alfred Deseilligny	Royalist

=== 3rd Ministry (17 May – 23 November 1877) ===
Portfolio	Holder	Party
President of the Council of Ministers	Albert de Broglie	Royalist
Ministers
Minister of Justice	Albert de Broglie	Royalist
Minister of Foreign Affairs	Louis Decazes	Royalist
Minister of the Interior	Oscar Bardi de Fourtou	Royalist
Minister of Finance	Eugène Caillaux	Royalist
Minister of War	Brig. Gen. Jean Auguste Berthaut	None
Minister of the Navy and Colonies	Vice Admiral Albert Gicquel des Touches	None
Minister of Public Education, Fine Arts and Worship	Joseph Brunet	Royalist
Minister of Public Works	Auguste Paris	Royalist
Minister of Agriculture and Commerce	Alfred de Meaux	Royalist

== Bibliography ==
De Broglie edited:

- The Souvenirs of his father (1886, etc.)
- The Mémoires de Talleyrand (1891, etc.)
- Letters of the Duchess Albertine de Broglie (1896)

He published:

- Le Secret du roi, Correspondance secrète de Louis XV avec ses agents diplomatiques, 1752–1774 (1878)
- Frédéric II et Marie Thérèse (1883)
- Frédéric II et Louis XV (1885)
- Marie Thérèse Impératrice (1888)
- Le Père Lacordaire (1889)
- Maurice de Saxe et le marquis d'Argenson (1891)
- La Paix d'Aix-la-Chapelle (1892)
- L'Alliance autrichienne (1895)
- La Mission de M. de Gontaut-Biron à Berlin (1896)
- Voltaire avant et pendant la Guerre de Sept Ans (1898)
- Saint Ambroise (trans., Margaret Maitland in the series, The Saints) (1899)

He wrote memoirs around 1895, which were published in instalments in the Revue des Deux Mondes between 1925 and 1929, and collected in book format in 1938, with a postface by his grandson the 6th Duke: — (c. 1895). Mémoires (in French). Paris: Calmann-Lévy. 2 vol.

== Family ==
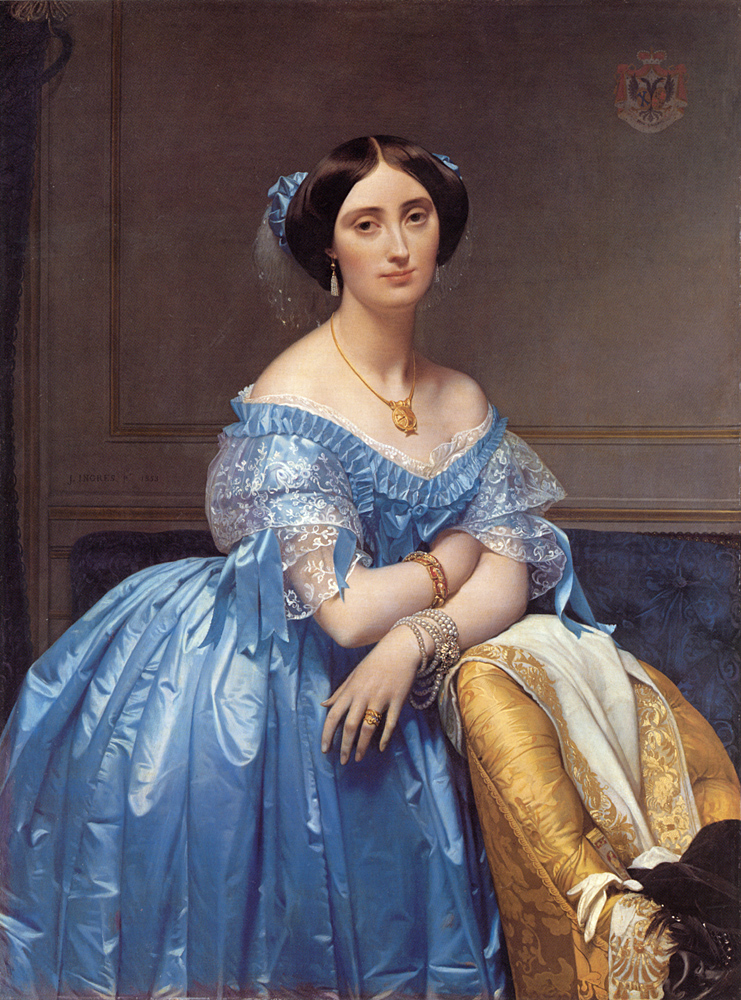
The Princesse de Broglie, the 1853 portrait of Princesse Albert de Broglie, née Joséphine-Eléonore-Marie-Pauline de Galard de Brassac de Béarn by Jean Auguste Dominique Ingres.

On 18 June 1845, styled Prince de Broglie, he married Joséphine-Eléonore-Marie-Pauline de Galard de Brassac de Béarn (1825–1860).

They had the following children:

- Louis-Alphonse-Victor, 5th duc de Broglie (1846 – 1906) father of the scientist brothers including the 7th Duke, the Nobel Laureate.
- Maurice (1848 – 1862)
- Henri-Amédée (1849 – 1917)
- François-Marie-Albert (1851 – 1939) great-grandfather of the 8th duke, Victor-François, 8th duc de Broglie (1949 – 2012).
- César-Paul-Emmanuel (1854 – 1926)

== Honours and titles ==
- Duke of France (succeeded as 4th Duke of Broglie 1870)
- Chevalier, Légion d'honneur (1845)

== Notes ==
Political offices
Preceded by Comte de Rémusat	Minister of Foreign Affairs; 1873	Succeeded by Louis Decazes
Preceded by Jules Dufaure	Prime Minister of France; 1873–1874	Succeeded by Ernest Courtot de Cissey
Preceded by Charles Beulé	Minister of the Interior; 1873–1874	Succeeded by Oscar Bardi de Fourtou
Preceded by Louis Martel	Minister of Justice; 1877	Succeeded by François Le Pelletier
Preceded by Jules Simon	Prime Minister of France; 1877	Succeeded by Gaëtan de Rochebouët
French nobility
Preceded by Victor de Broglie	Duke of Broglie; 1870–1901	Succeeded by Victor de Broglie
