= The Princesse de Broglie =

Painting by Jean-Auguste-Dominique Ingres

- La Princesse de Broglie (French)
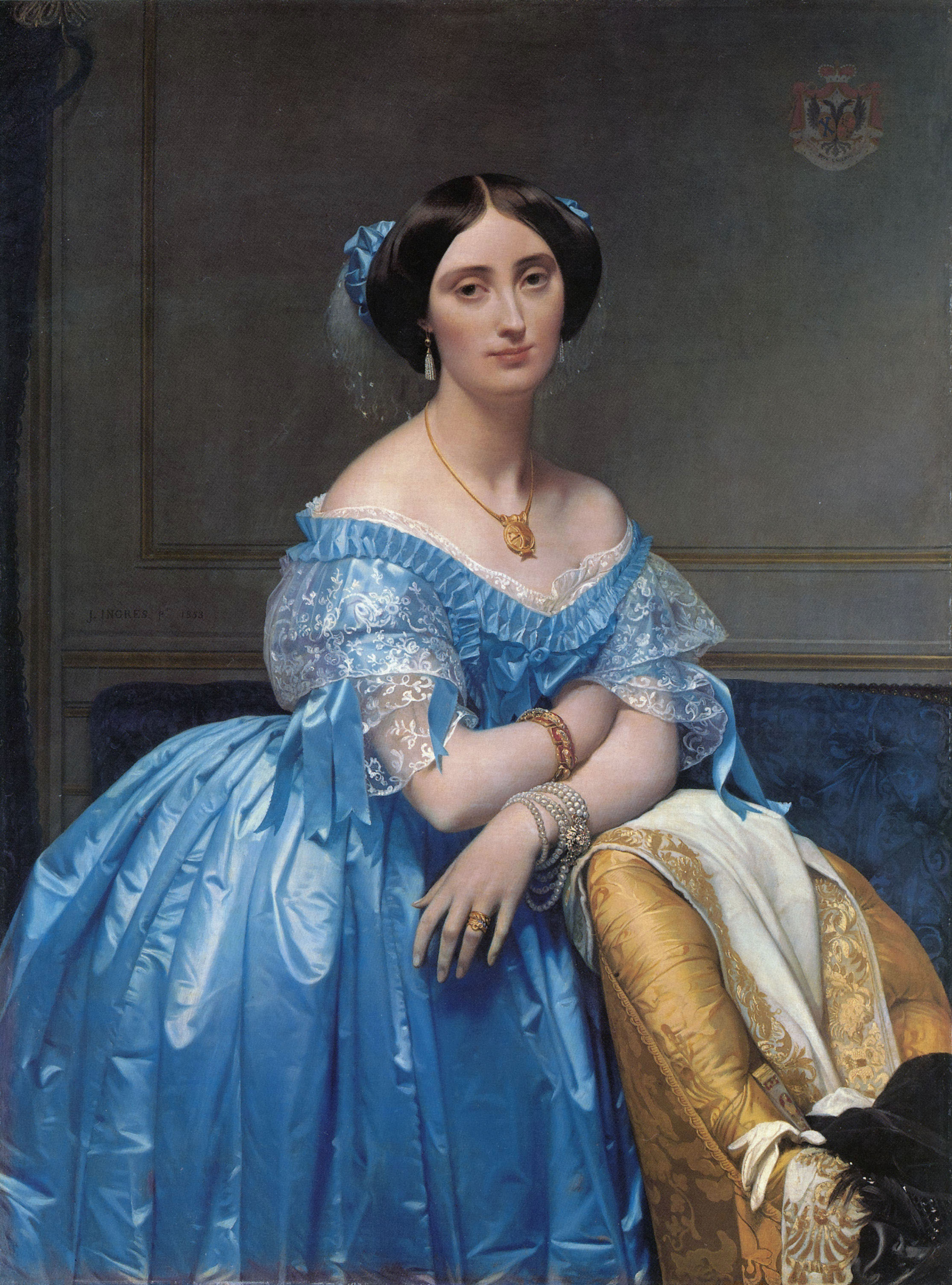
- Portrait of Princess Albert de Broglie
- Artist: Jean-Auguste-Dominique Ingres
- Year: 1851–1853
- Medium: Oil-on-canvas
- Subject: Pauline de Galard de Brassac de Bearn
- Dimensions: 121.3 cm × 90.9 cm (47.8 in × 35.8 in)
- Location: Metropolitan Museum of Art, New York City
- Accession: 1975.1.18

The Princesse de Broglie (French: La Princesse de Broglie [la pʁɛ̃.sɛs də bʁɔj]) is an oil-on-canvas painting by the French Neoclassical artist Jean-Auguste-Dominique Ingres. It was painted between 1851 and 1853, and shows Pauline de Broglie, who adopted the courtesy title 'Princesse'. Born Pauline de Galard de Brassac de Béarn, she married Albert de Broglie, the future 28th prime minister of France, in 1845. Pauline was 28 at the time of the painting's completion. She was highly intelligent and widely known for her beauty, but she suffered from profound shyness and the painting captures her melancholia. Pauline contracted tuberculosis in her early 30s and died in 1860 aged 35. Although Albert lived until 1901, he was heartbroken and did not remarry.

Ingres undertook a number of preparatory pencil sketches for the commission, each of which captures her personality and taste. They show her in various poses, including standing, and in differently styled dresses. The final painting is considered one of Ingres's finest later-period portraits of women, along with the Portraits of Comtesse d'Haussonville, Baronne de Rothschild and Madame Moitessier. As with many of Ingres's portraits of women, details of the costume and setting are rendered with precision while the body seems to lack a solid bone structure. The painting is held in the collection of the Metropolitan Museum of Art, New York, and is signed and dated 1853.

== Commission ==
Joséphine-Éléonore-Marie-Pauline de Galard de Brassac de Béarn (1825–1860) married Albert, 4th Duke de Broglie on 18 June 1845, and they had five sons together. On the occasion of their marriage, they styled themselves 'Princesse' and 'Prince' respectively, due to the former title of 'Prince of the Holy Roman Empire' granted to the House of Broglie (1759). Pauline was a highly intelligent and religious woman, who was well read and wrote a number of texts over her lifetime. Her shyness was well known; she was widely considered strikingly beautiful and charming, but those around her would often avoid eye contact so as not to embarrass her. Albert was devoted to his wife, and commissioned the painting after being impressed by Ingres's 1845 portrait of his sister, the Comtesse d'Haussonville. Albert approached Ingres around 1850 to undertake the portrait. Ingres dined with the de Broglie family in January 1850, and according to one eyewitness, "seemed to be very happy with his model".

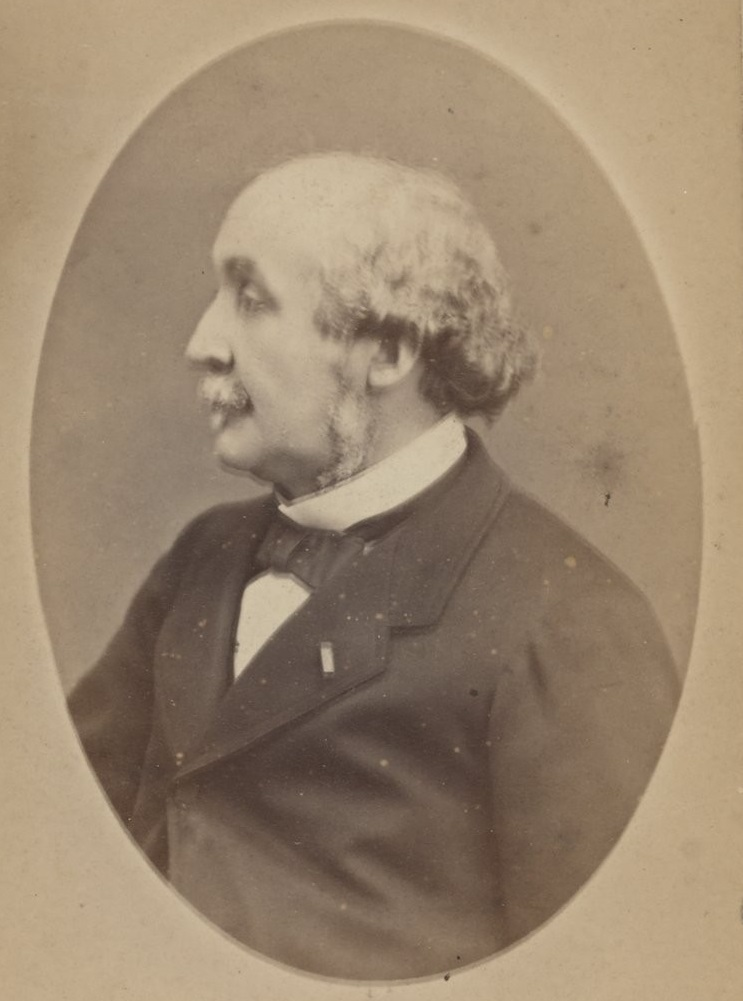
Albert, 4th duc de Broglie, the 28th Prime Minister of France

Although Ingres's chief source of income came from portraiture, it distracted from his main interest in history painting, which early in his career, was far less lucrative. He found acclaim in the 1840s, when he became successful enough to no longer depend on commissions. This painting was Ingres's second-last female portrait, and final society portrait. Influenced by the working methods of Jacques-Louis David, Ingres began with a number of nude preparatory sketches, for which he employed professional models. He built up a picture of the sitter's underlying anatomy, as seen in the Musée Bonnat study, before deciding how to design the lavish costume and accessories. Although there is no surviving record of the commission, and the exact sequence of events is uncertain, the sketches can be dated from 1850, the year the style of her evening dress came into fashion. Ingres signed and dated the final picture at the left centre "J. INGRES. pit 1853".

Pauline died in 1860 aged 35 from tuberculosis. After her death, Albert published three volumes of her essays on religious history. Albert (who, in 1873, became the 28th Prime Minister of France) lived until 1901, but was heartbroken and did not remarry. He kept her portrait for the remainder of his life draped in fabric and hidden behind a velvet curtain, lending it only to select exhibitions. After his death, the painting passed within the family until 1958 when it was sold to the Metropolitan Museum of Art via the banker and art collector Robert Lehman, and is today held in the Lehman Wing. The family kept most of the jewellery and accessories seen in the painting, although the marabou feathers were sold to the Costume Institute of the Metropolitan Museum.

== Preparatory studies ==
There are comparatively few extant preparatory sketches for the de Broglie painting compared to other portraits of his later period. Ingres's usual technique was to use sketches both to plot the final work and to provide guidance for assistants on whom he relied to paint in the less important passages. Some others have been lost or destroyed.

The extant sketches date from 1850 to 1853 and are drawn with graphite on paper or tracing paper. They vary in elaboration and detail, but show Ingres thinking through the eventual form and pose of the sitter. The earliest consists of a brief sketch of the princess in a seated pose. There is a full-length study of a nude standing in essentially the final pose, in which Ingres experimented with two different positions of the crossed arms. A second full-length study shows a clothed figure. Two others are focused on her hands. A highly finished drawing of the princess standing with her left hand at the neck and dressed in a simpler costume than in the painting may be a study for the painting or an independent work. Besides these five or six extant sketches, about the same number are known to be lost.

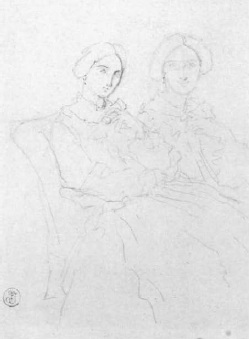
Study for a Portrait of the Princesse de Broglie, c. 1850–51

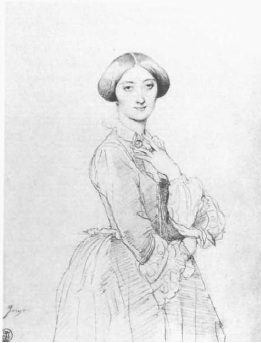
Princesse de Broglie, c. 1851–52. Graphite on paper, 31.2x23.5 cm. Private collection.

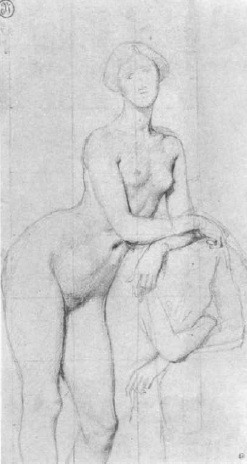
Study, c. 1852–53. Graphite on paper, 30x16 cm. Musée Bonnat, Bayonne.

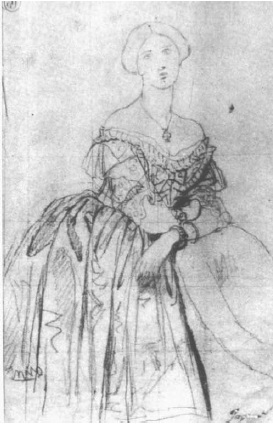
Study, c. 1852–53. Graphite and red chalk on paper, 27.8x17.5 cm. Location unknown.

The painting's central motifs were already established in the earliest studies, in which her oval face, arched eyebrows, and habit of folding her arms, with one arm stuffed into the opposite sleeve, appear. Ingres found the sittings difficult and agonised over every detail. He wrote to his friend and patron Charles Marcotte that he was "killing [his] eyes on the background of the Princesse de Broglie, which I am painting at her house, and that helps me advance a great deal; but, alas, how these portraits make me suffer, and this will surely be the last one, excepting, however, the portrait of [his second wife] Delphine."

== Description ==
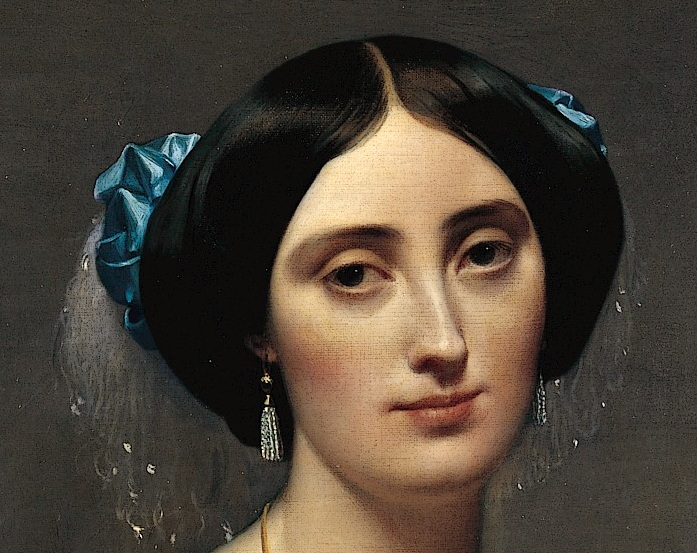
Detail showing pearl earrings and draped pearl laced marabou feathers

The Princesse de Broglie is shown in three-quarters view, her arms resting on a lavishly upholstered, pale gold damask easy chair. Her head is tilted to the viewer's left, and her black hair is tightly pulled back and bound by blue satin ribbons. She is pictured in the family home at 90 rue de l'Université in Paris, in an evening dress that implies she is about to go out for the evening. She is dressed in the height of contemporary Parisian fashion, in particular the opulent Second Empire fashions then current in clothing, jewellery, and furniture. She wears a gold embroidered evening shawl, and an off-the-shoulder, pale blue satin hoop skirt gown, with short sleeves and a lace and ribbon trim, highly emblematic of 1850s evening dress. Her hair is covered with a sheer frill trimmed with matching blue ribbon knots, and is swept back with a centre parting.

Her adornments include a necklace, tasselled earrings and bracelets on each wrist. Her pendant with cross pattée signifies her piety, and was perhaps designed by Fortunato Pio Castellani or Mellerio dits Meller. Her earrings are made from cascades of small natural pearls. Her left wrist has a bracelet of roped pearls; the one on her right is made of enamelled red and diamond-set gold links. The necklace is held by a double-looped chain holding a gold pendant, which appears to be an original Roman bulla.

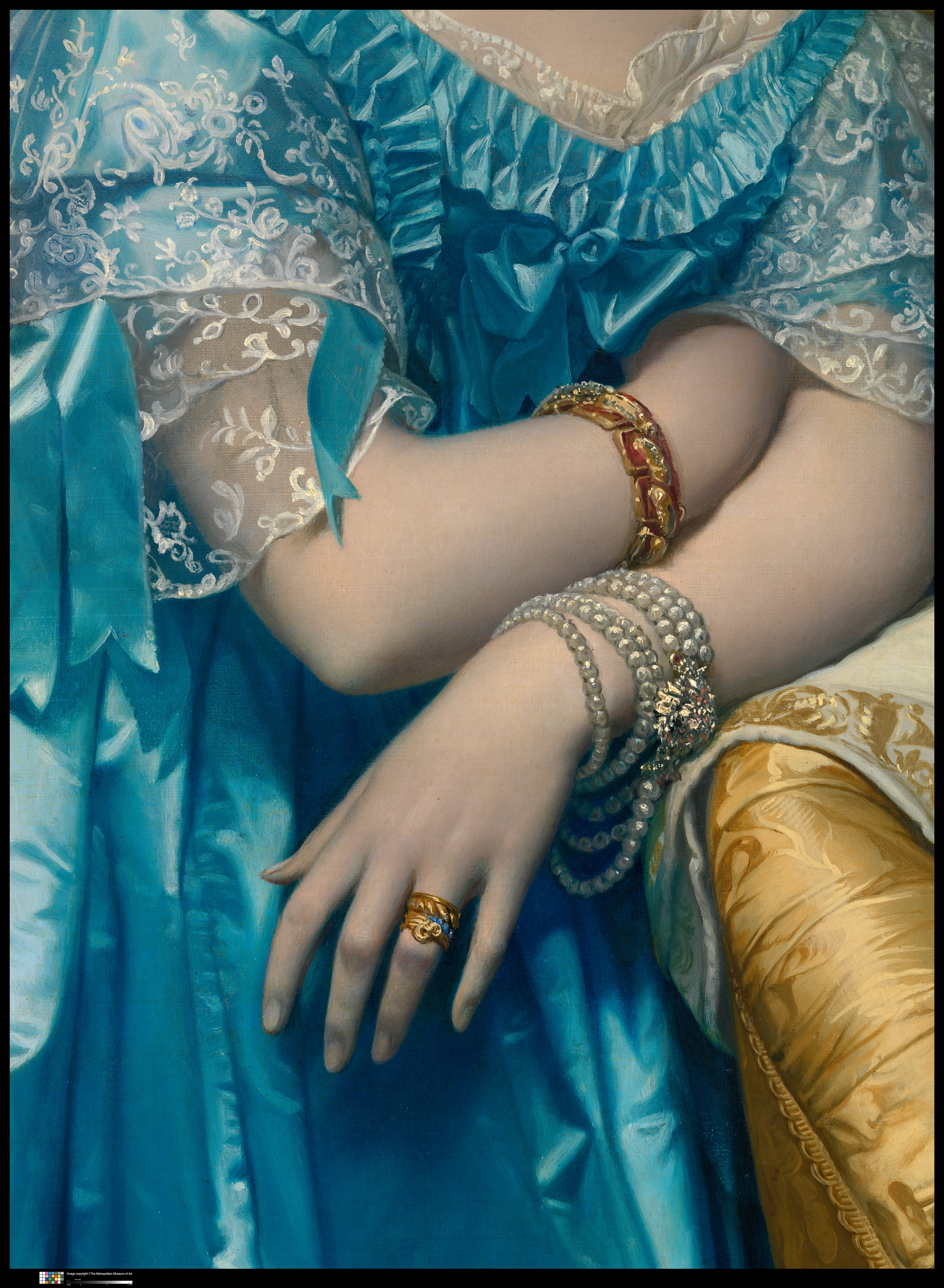
Detail with lace dress trimmings, jewellery, rings, tucked hand, elongated fingers, and yellow gold chair

As with all of Ingres's portraits of women, her body seems to lack a solid bone structure. Her neck is unusually elongated, and her arms seem boneless or dislocated, while her left forearm appears to be under-modelled and lacking in musculature. Her oval face and her expression are idealised, lacking the level of detail given to other foreground elements, although she was widely known as a great beauty.

The painting is composed of grey, white, blue, yellow and gold hues. The costume and decor are painted with a supreme precision, crispness and realism that art historians have compared to the work of Jan van Eyck. In many ways the painting is austere; art historian Robert Rosenblum describes a "glassy chill", and "astonishing chromatic harmonies that, for exquisite, silvery coolness, are perhaps only rivaled by Vermeer". Her facial features are statuesque and in places display the quality of porcelain. The painting contains a number of pentimenti, including around the contours of her hair, and the yellow chair. There are horizontal bands about 2.5 cm wide in yellow paint on either side of her head near the earrings. They seem to have been used to plot the positioning of the mouldings. The black hat on the chair seems to have been a late addition. There are visible passages of underdrawing where the artist seems to trace out shapes and positions, established in the preparatory sketches, onto the grounded canvas. These include squared lines around the left shoulder and chest areas. There are lines mapping out the throat and top edge of the bodice.

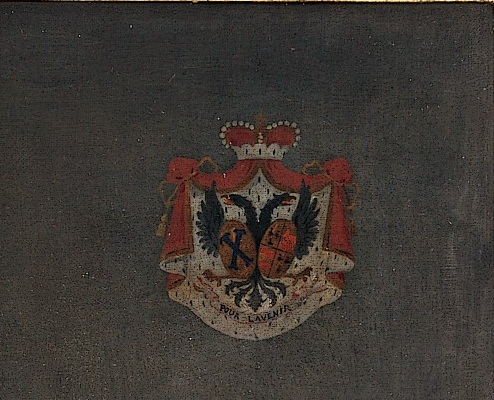
Coat of arms combining the heraldics of the de Broglie and de Bearn families

Compared to the Portrait of Comtesse d'Haussonville, or most of Ingres's later portraits, the background is flat and featureless, probably to place emphasis on the coat of arms. It comprises a neutral soft pale gray and evenly textured wall, with a linear structured gilded wood mouldings, and a fictitious coat of arms combining the heraldics of the de Broglie and de Bearn families. The grey wall is underlined with a barely discernible deep blue pigment. This minimalist approach reflects the "ascetic elegance" of his early female portraits, where the sitter was often set against featureless backdrops. The precisely rendered details and geometric background create an impression of immobility, though subtle movement is implied by the tilt of her head and the shimmering folds of her dress.

The current frame measures 157 × 125.6 cm at the exterior and is made of pink-orange pine, lined with a garland of gilt-plastered ornament flowers. Its ornaments lie on ovolo molding. It was produced in the United States between 1950 and 1960 (around the time the Metropolitan acquired the work) in the French Louis XIII style fashionable in Ingres's period. It is similar to, and probably modeled on, the frame used for Madame Moitessier, which is most likely an original and is dated 1856. The original de Broglie plaster frame was made in 1860 at the latest, and is thought to have been similar to the current one.

== Reception ==
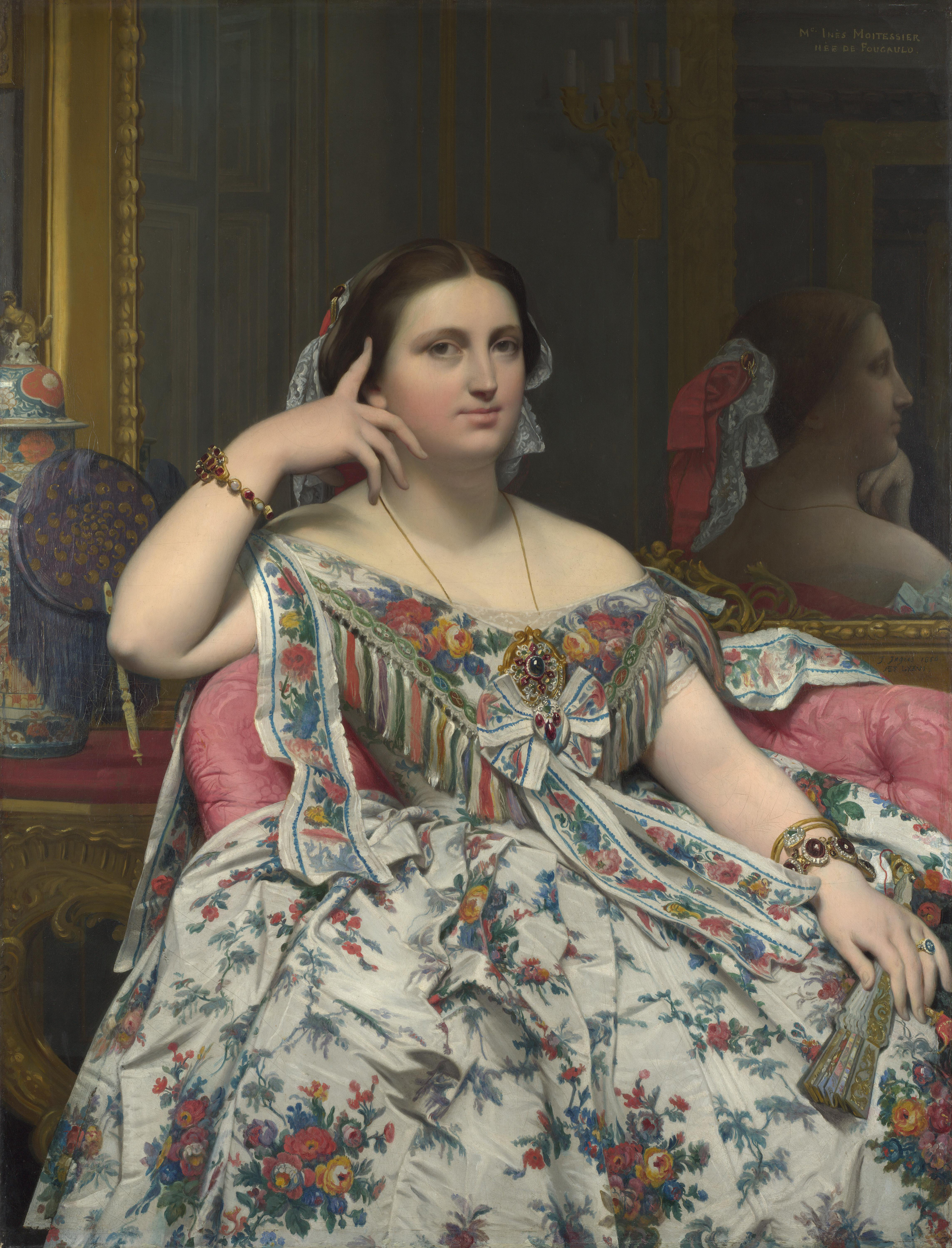
Portrait of Madame Moitessier, 1856. National Gallery, London.

The painting remained in Ingres's possession until 1854, when it was first exhibited that December in his studio, alongside his unfinished Madame Moitessier (c. 1844–1856), Portrait of Lorenzo Bartolini, and c. 1808 Venus Anadyomene. One critic wrote that the painting showed Pauline as "refined, delicate, elegant to her finger tips ... a marvelous incarnation of nobility." In general, it is held in the same high regard as Ingres's Comtesse d'Haussonville, and Portrait of Baronne de Rothschild.

The work was an instant critical and popular success, and widely admired and written about. Most critics understood the artfulness of physical deformations, although one writer, writing under the byline A. de. G., and representing a minority, academic view, describes her as a "puny, wilted, sickly woman; her thin arms rest on an armchair placed in front of her. M. Ingres has rendered in an unheard-of manner these large, veiled eyes, deprived of sight. He has given this face a negative expression that he must have seen in real life, and reproduced it with a sure touch." The majority of critics noted Ingres's attention to detail in describing her clothes, accessories and decor, and saw an artist at the height of his creativity, with a few invoking the precision of van Eyck. Some writers detected a hint of melancholy in de Broglie's eyes and expression.

== Provenance ==
The painting remained in the sitter's family until 1958, when it was acquired by Robert Lehman through the gallery Wildenstein & Company. Lehman donated it to the Metropolitan Museum of Art, which received it from his estate in 1975, where it became part of the Lehman Collection.

In 2025, the painting sustained minor damage when a teenage tourist splashed it with water during a vandalism spree. The museum stated that repairs would cost approximately $1,000.
