= Portrait of Madame Moitessier =

Painting by Jean-Auguste-Dominique Ingres

Madame Moitessier
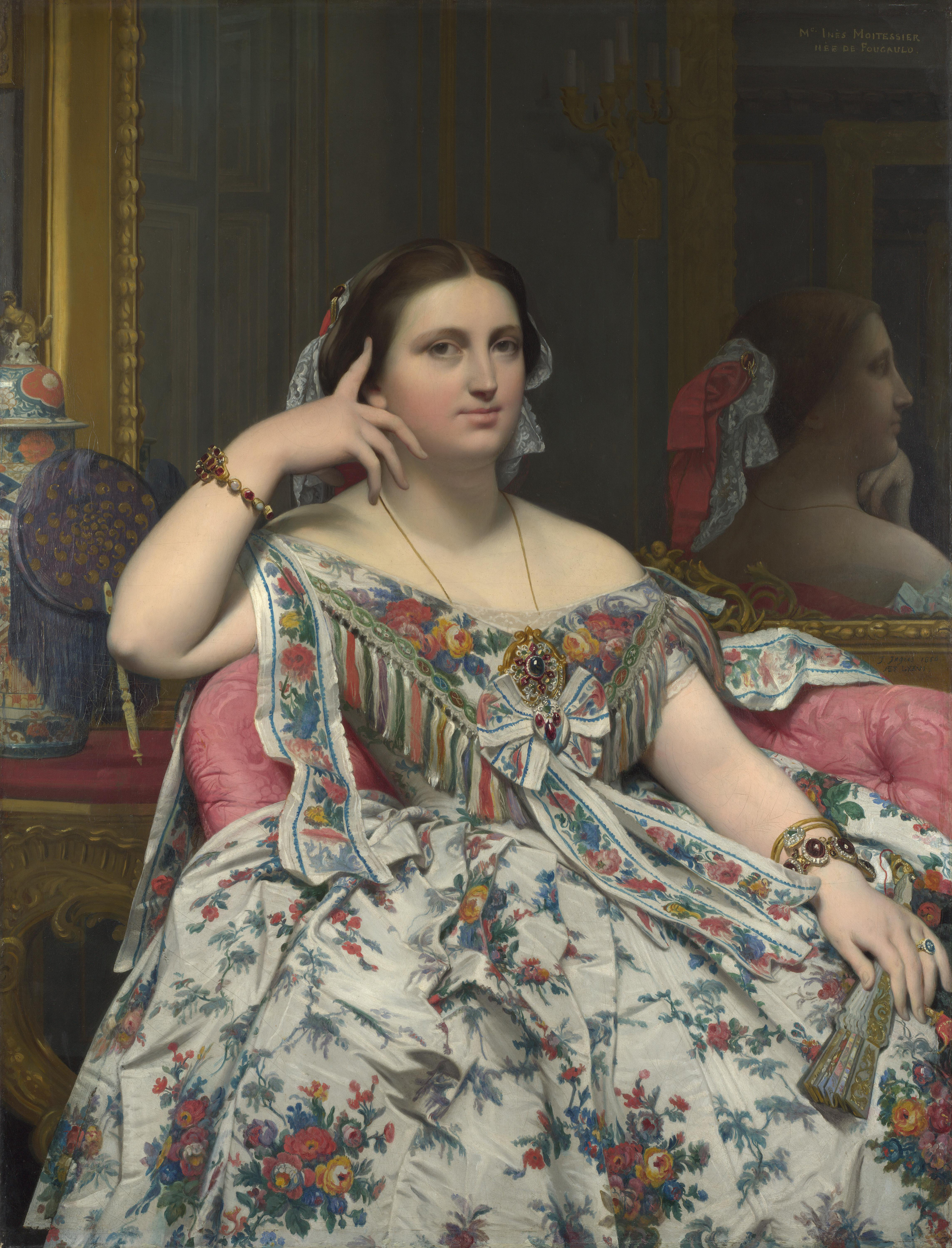
- Artist: Jean-Auguste-Dominique Ingres
- Year: 1856
- Medium: Oil on canvas
- Dimensions: 121.3 cm × 90.9 cm (47.8 in × 35.8 in)
- Location: National Gallery; London

Madame Moitessier is a portrait of Marie-Clotilde-Inès Moitessier (née de Foucauld) begun in 1844 and completed in 1856 by Jean-Auguste-Dominique Ingres. The portrait, which depicts Madame Moitessier seated, has been in the collection of the National Gallery in London since 1946.

Madame Moitessier is also the title of a second portrait by Ingres, which depicts her standing. That version was painted in 1851 and is in the collection of the National Gallery of Art, Washington, D.C.

== Subject ==
1851 standing portrait (National Gallery of Art, Washington, D.C.)

Marie-Clotilde-Inès de Foucauld (1821–1897) was the daughter of a French civil servant in the department of forests and waterways. In 1842 she married a widower twice her age, the rich banker and lace merchant Sigisbert Moitessier, thus becoming Madame Moitessier. In 1844 Ingres was approached by his longtime friend and former painting subject Charles Marcotte, who was one of Sigisbert Moitessier's colleagues, with the idea of painting Madame Moitessier's portrait.

Reluctant at this stage in his career to accept portrait commissions—he considered portraiture to be a lower form of art than history painting—he initially refused Marcotte's request. However, when Ingres met Madame Moitessier, he was struck by her beauty and agreed to produce a portrait. Art critic Théophile Gautier, who watched during some of the painting sessions, agreed with Ingres, describing her beauty as the most regal, magnificent, stately and Junoesque that he had ever seen drawn.

== Two portraits ==
He began work on the seated version, depicting the subject in a floral dress. Work on the commission proceeded slowly. The painting was originally to include the Moitessiers' daughter, Catherine; Ingres, finding little Catherine "impossible", eliminated her from the composition sometime around 1847. Work on the painting was suspended in 1849, when the death in June of Ingres' wife left him unable to work for several months, and Madame Moitessier was distracted by her second pregnancy and the death of her father. In June 1851, having been reminded by the woman he called "la belle et bonne" ("the beautiful and good") that her portrait had still not been completed, Ingres began afresh, painting the standing portrait of her in a dark dress, which he finished in December 1851. He then returned to the seated portrait, which he completed in 1856, twelve years after he started it.

Characteristically, Ingres found inspiration in the art of the past when painting Madame Moitessier. The pose with a hand touching the cheek was taken from a fresco of Hercules and Telephus from Herculaneum that he may have seen in Naples in 1814, and which was familiar to him through engravings. According to the National Gallery, Titian's La Schiavona, also in the gallery, may have inspired the second profile view in the mirror. She is wearing a dress of fashionable and expensive Lyon silk printed with a floral pattern, which is echoed by the flowers and leaves of the gilt frame. A similar frame was used for Ingres's 1853 portrait of The Princesse de Broglie.

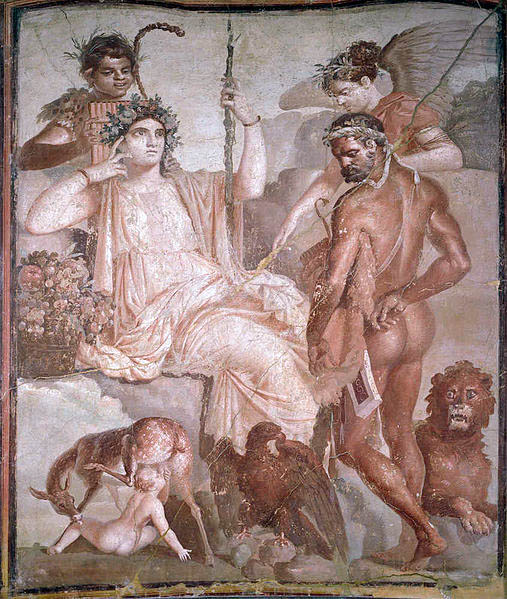
Fresco of Hercules and Telephus from Herculaneum, 1st century BC

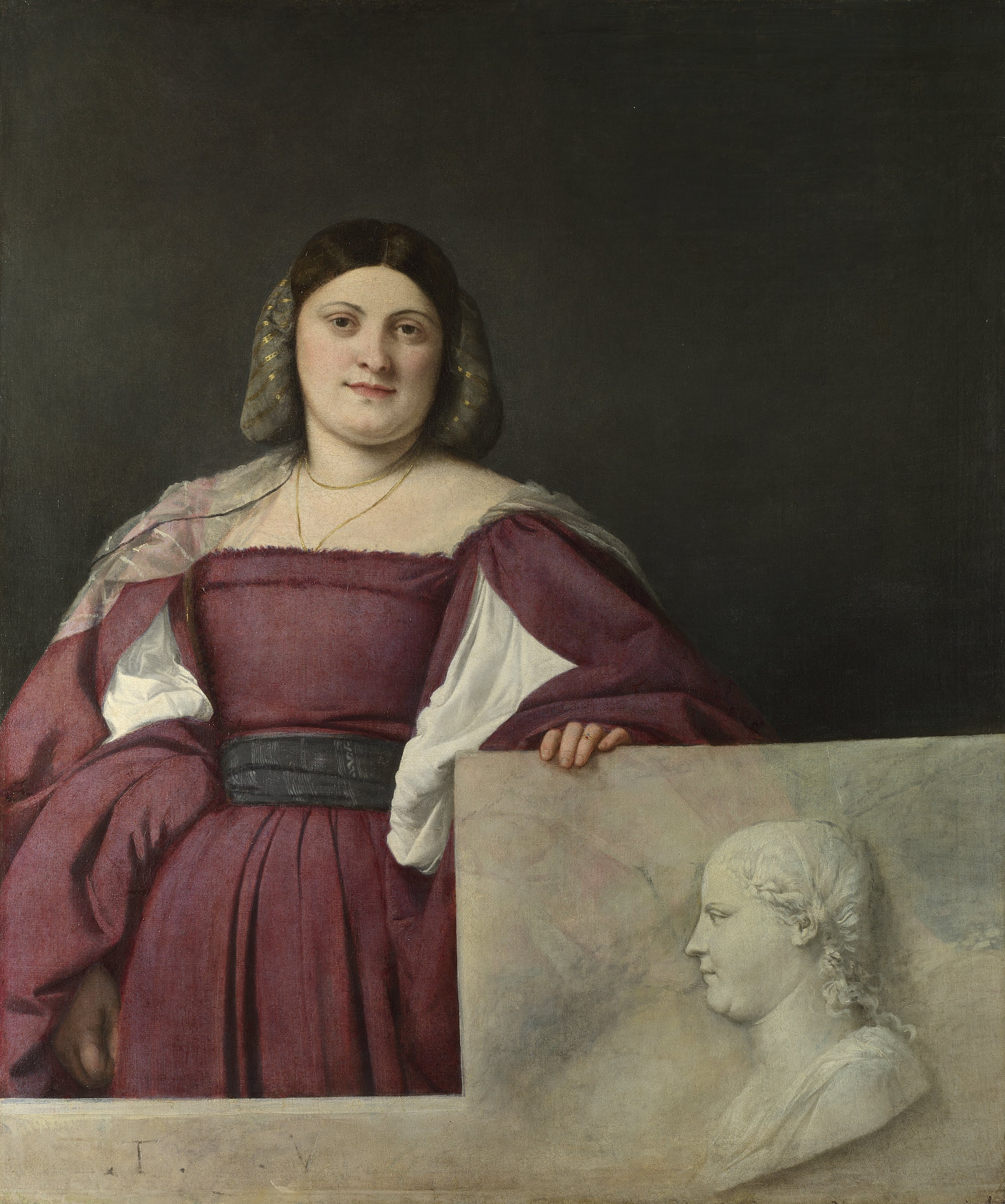
Titian, La Schiavona, 1510–12

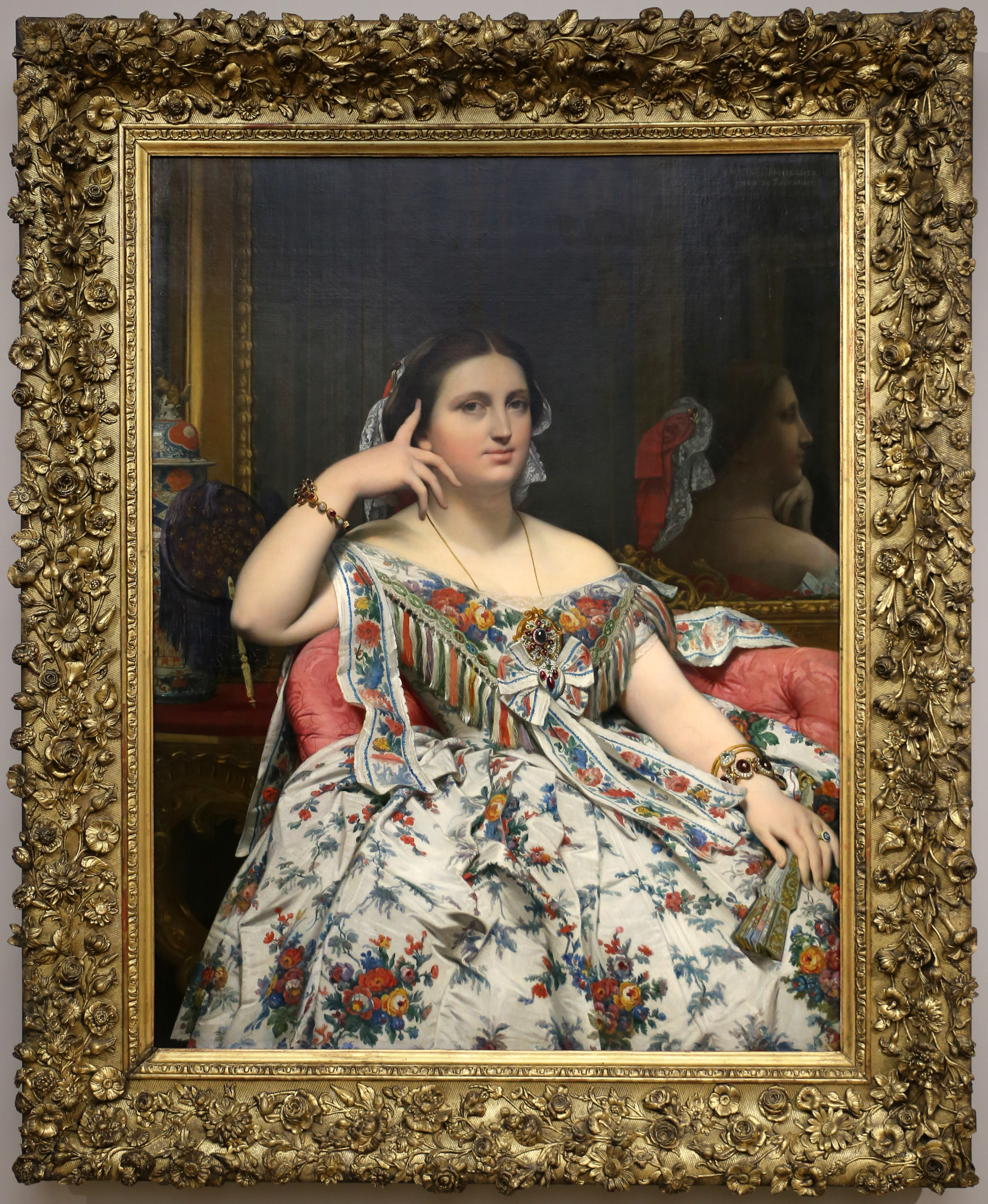
Madame Moitessier in context: The heavily decorated frame echoes the floral pattern of the sitter's dress

Numerous drawn studies for both portraits exist. A study on canvas for the seated portrait, in which the figure has been drawn by Ingres and the background painted by an assistant, is in the Musée Ingres in Montauban.

== Legacy ==
Pablo Picasso first encountered the painting at an exhibition in Paris, in 1921. Over the next decade, he repeatedly referenced Ingres in his art, particularly in his homage in the painting Woman with a Book. The model for Woman with a Book, Picasso's then young mistress, Marie-Thérèse Walter, mimics Madame Moitessier’s pose. The painting was completed in August 1932. The painting is currently held by the Norton Simon Museum, in Pasadena, California, United States.

The two paintings were exhibited together for the first time at a temporary exhibition organised in partnership with the Norton Simon Museum, held at the National Gallery in London, United Kingdom in 2022.

== See also ==
- List of paintings by Jean-Auguste-Dominique Ingres
