= Schiavone =

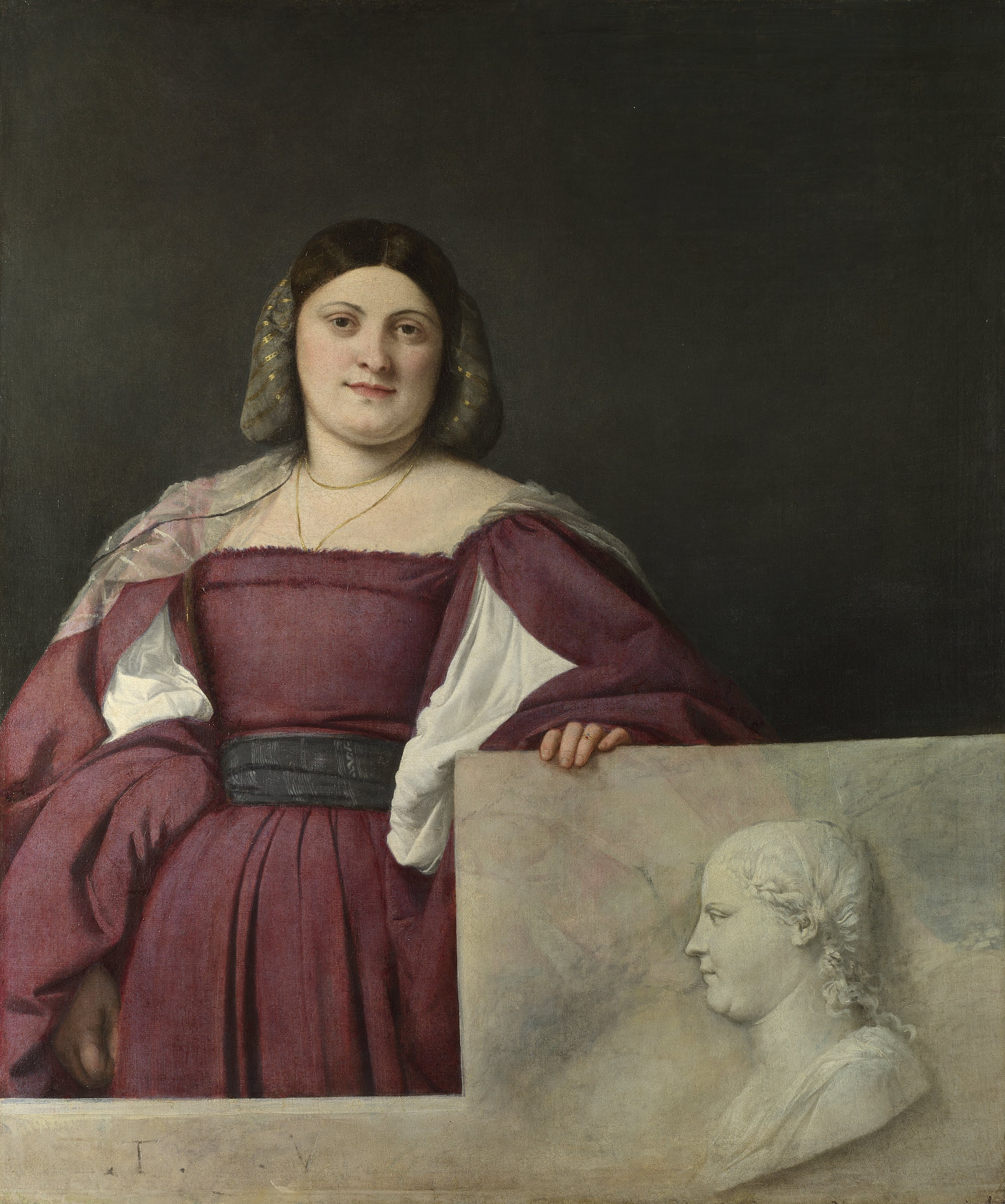
La Schiavona, 1510–12 portrait by Titian.

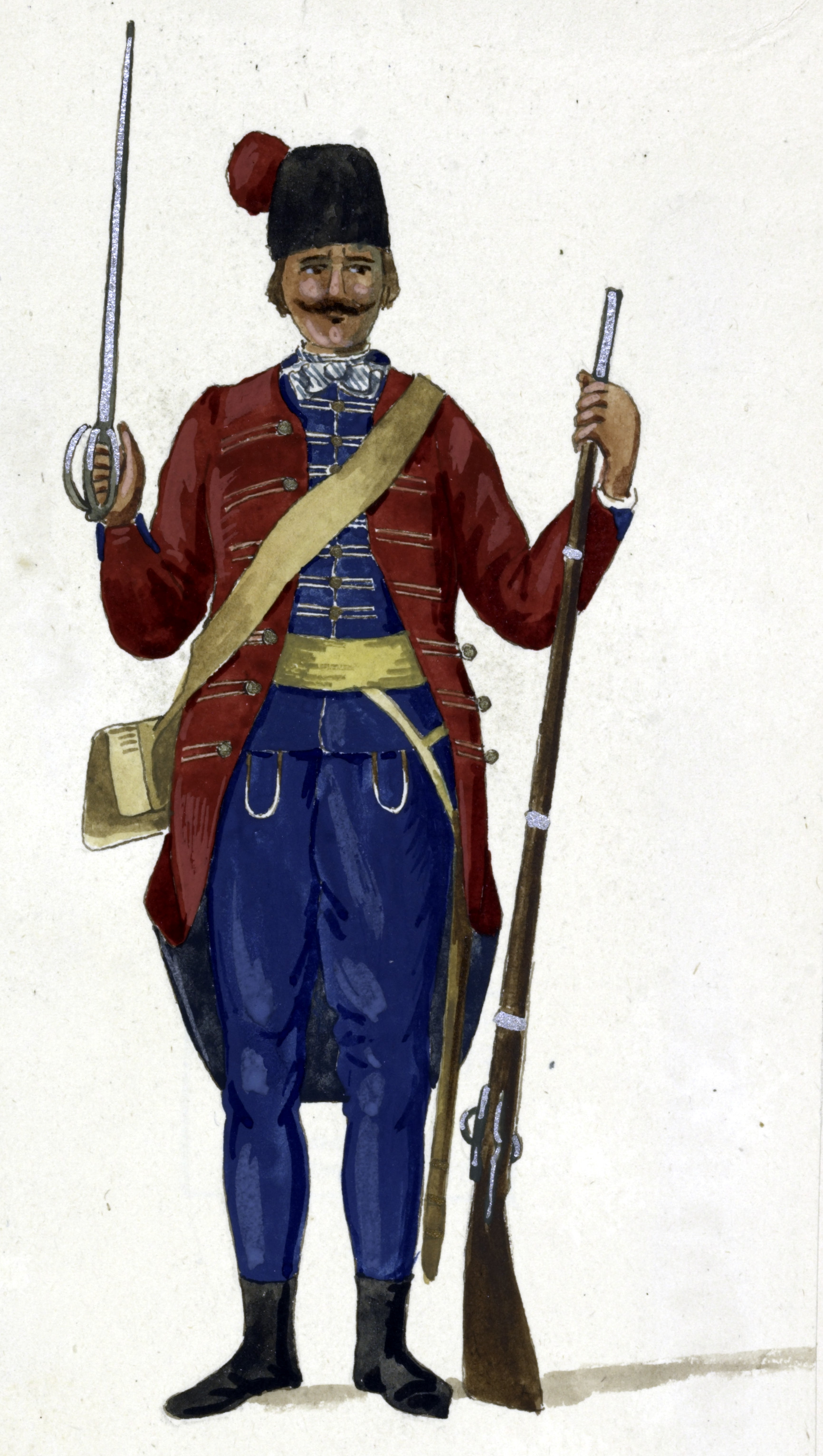
A Schiavone of the Venetian army

Schiavone (pronounced [skjaˈvoːne]; feminine Schiavona, plural Schiavoni) is an Italian ethnonym literally meaning 'Slav' in Old Venetian (modern form S-ciavon). Originally, this term indicated origins in the lands of Dalmatia and Istria (in present-day Slovenia and Croatia), when under the rule of the Republic of Venice. Today it is an Italian surname.

== History ==
The importance of Schiavoni's role in the Venetian Republic is best shown by the name of one of the main streets in Venice, Riva degli Schiavoni, just in front of the Doge Palace and St. Mark's Square.

A number of artists who worked in Italy who were of Slavic descent were nicknamed Schiavone by their origin: some famous examples, among others, are painters Giulio Clovio and Federico Bencovich.

Schiavone was also a designation of the Oltremarini, a military unit of the same descent in the Venetian Navy. The basket-hilted sword schiavona was also named after the Schiavone.

Historically, the term has also been used in reference to the southern Italian community of Molise Croats.

== Toponymy ==
- Ginestra degli Schiavoni, Campania, Italy
- Riva degli Schiavoni, Venice, Italy
- San Giacomo degli Schiavoni, Molise, Italy
- San Giorgio degli Schiavoni, a historical building in Venice, Italy
- San Girolamo degli Schiavoni, a church in Rome, Italy
- Villa Schiavoni near Nepezzano, Abruzzo, Italy

== Surname ==
In Italy, the surname Schiavone mostly occurs in the southernmost regions of the mainland, namely Campania and Apulia, but it is also common in Rome, Turin, Milan, and Syracuse. Due to emigration, branches of the Schiavone family can also be found in Argentina, Brazil, Malta, Uruguay, Luxembourg, United Kingdom, the Philippines the United States, and Canada.

=== People ===
- Sebastiano Schiavone da Rovigno (1420–1505), Croatian/Venetian woodcarver and marquetry artist
- Giorgio Schiavone (Juraj Ćulinović, 1433–1504), Croatian/Venetian painter
- Andrea Schiavone (Andrea Meldolla/Medulić, c. 1510/15–1563), Croatian/Venetian artist
- Carmine Schiavone (1943–2015), Italian Camorra mobster and pentito
- Francesco Schiavone (born 1953), Italian Camorra mobster
- Patrick Schiavone, American Ford F-150 designer
- Tony Schiavone (born 1957), American wrestling announcer
- Francesca Schiavone (born 1980), Italian tennis player
- Assunta De Rossi (born Assunta Schiavone in 1983), Philippine actress
- Alessandra De Rossi (born Alessandra Schiavone in 1984), Philippine actress
- Patricio Schiavone (born 1985), Argentine actor
- Derek Schiavone (born 1985), Canadian footballer
- Laura Schiavone (born 1986), Italian rower
- Andrea Schiavone (footballer) (born 1993), Italian footballer

=== Fictional characters ===
- Rocco Schiavone, the title character in an Italian crime drama series

== See also ==
- Schiavo
- Schiavi
- Schiavon
- Schiavoni
- Schiavonetti
- Schiavelli
- Schiavetti
