= Marabou =

Marabou can refer to:

- Marabou (chocolate), a Swedish chocolate brand
- Marabou (ethnicity), a historical term for a multiracial person in Haiti
- Marabou (weed), or el marabú in Cuba, the legume Dichrostachys cinerea
- Marabou stork, a large bird in the stork family Ciconiidae
- Marabou (fashion), downy feathers used as a fashion trimming. Historically known as "marabout."
- Marabou, a collection of poems by Nikos Kavvadias
- Marabou, a thrown silk typically dyed in the gum or a fabric made of said silk

== See also ==
- Marabout, the Moroccan term for a Muslim holy man
