= Schiavon (surname) =

Schiavon (pronounced [skjaˈvon]) is an Italian surname from Veneto, either derived from the town of Schiavon or from the old ethnonym Schiavone (i.e. Slav). Notable people with the surname include:

- Alberto Schiavon (born 1978), Italian snowboarder
- Beniamino Schiavon (c. 1900–1968), or "Mr. Nino of the Drake", Italian-American maître d'hôtel
- Dennis Schiavon (1960–2024), British musician
- Donatella Schiavon (born 1957), Italian swimmer
- Eros Schiavon (born 1983), Italian football player
- Giuseppe Schiavon (born 1941), Italian rower
- Lucio Schiavon (born 1976), Italian illustrator
- Luiz Schiavon (1958–2023), Brazilian singer and musician
- Silvano Schiavon (1942–1977), Italian racing cyclist
- Stefano Schiavon (born 1981), Italian researcher

== See also ==
- Schiavone
- Schiavoni
