= Moitessier =

Moitessier is a French surname. Notable people with the surname include:

- Bernard Moitessier (1925–1994), French sailor
- Madame Moitessier
