= Schiavo =

Schiavo (pronounced [ˈskjaːvo]) is an Italian surname and may refer to:

- Maria Grazia Schiavo, Italian operatic soprano
- Mary Schiavo, former Inspector General of the United States Department of Transportation
- Tomaso Schiavo, Venetian captain
- Terri Schiavo case, surrounding the woman whose medical condition garnered much media attention
  - The much-publicized Schiavo memo

== See also ==
- Schiavi
- Schiavone
