= Siege of Negroponte (1470) =

1470 battle during the First Ottoman–Venetian War

Coordinates: 38°28′N 23°16′E

- Part of the First Ottoman–Venetian War
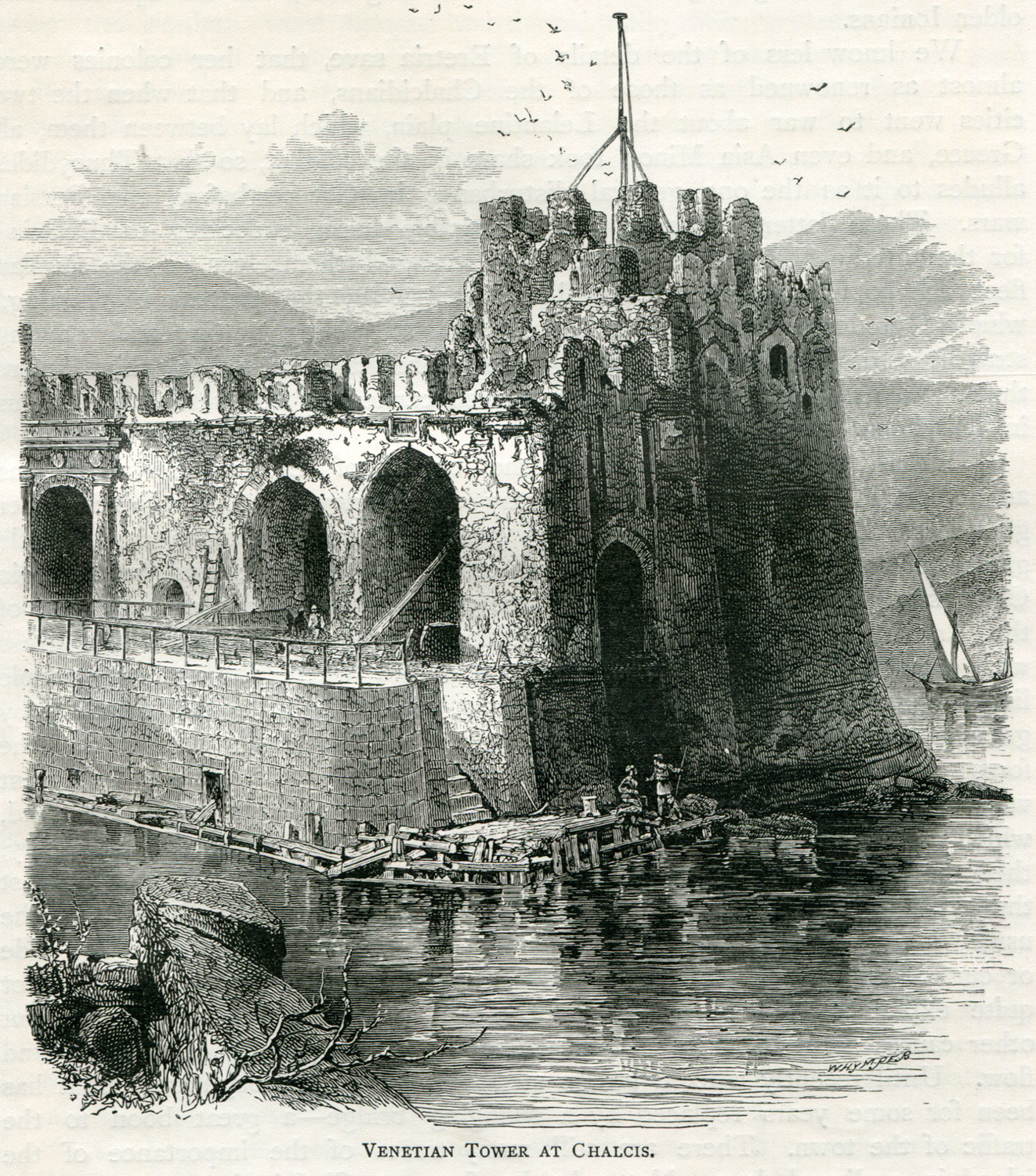
- The Venetian-era tower of the Castle of Negroponte in the late 19th century
Date	14 June – 12 July 1470
Location	Chalcis, Euboea
Result	Ottoman victory

Belligerents
Ottoman Empire	Republic of Venice

Commanders and leaders
Mehmed II; Mahmud Pasha; Gedik Ahmed; Rum Mehmed Pasha	Nicoló Canal; Paolo Erizzo (executed); Zuan Longo †; Zuan Tran †; Giacomo Loredan; Antonio Ottoban; Tomaso Schiavo; Fiorio di Nardone; Alvise Calbo †; Giovanni Badoer †

Strength
70,000 men 200 small transport boats	Unknown garrison forces 80,000 army force under Nicolò; 80 big ships

Casualties and losses
Unknown	More than 6,000

The siege of Negroponte was fought between the forces of the Ottoman Empire, led by Sultan Mehmed II in person, and the garrison of the Venetian colony of Negroponte (Chalcis), the capital of the Venetian possession of Euboea in Central Greece. The Ottoman sultan Mehmed II laid siege to the fortress at Negroponte. The siege lasted for almost a month, and, despite great Ottoman casualties, ended in the capture of the city and the island of Euboea by the Ottomans.

== Naval battle and siege ==
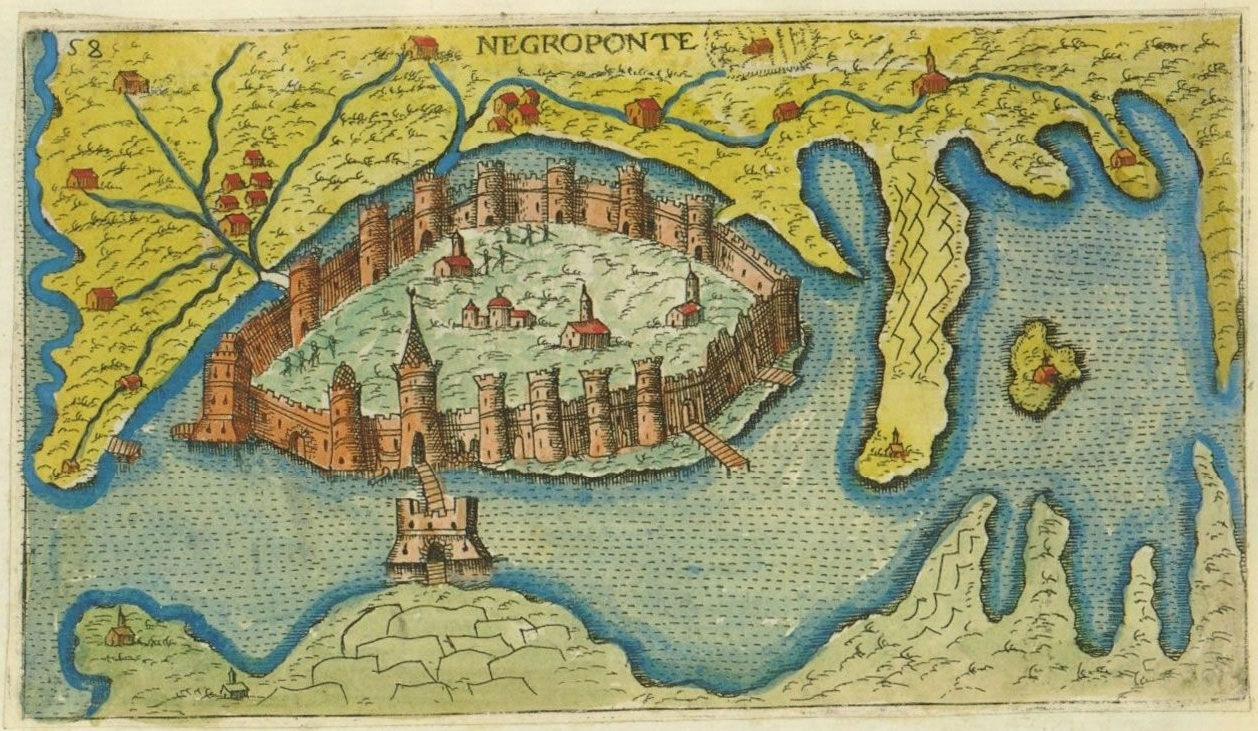
Negroponte castle

Mehmed II started preparations to respond to the destruction caused by the Venetian navy on the islands and Enez, and to capture this island, which was considered an outpost of the Venetians. However, these preparations were kept secret and the expedition was presented as if it would be on Rhodes. Finally, a large fleet under the command of Mahmud Pasha set out from Gallipoli in 1470, captured the island of Shira on the way, and then besieged Negroponte. The Venetians sent a relief force under the command of Nicolò Canal, known as "a man of letters rather than a fighter, a learned man readier to read books than direct the affairs of the sea." The relief force could not prevent the Turkish fleet from entering the Negroponte canal on June 14, 1470.

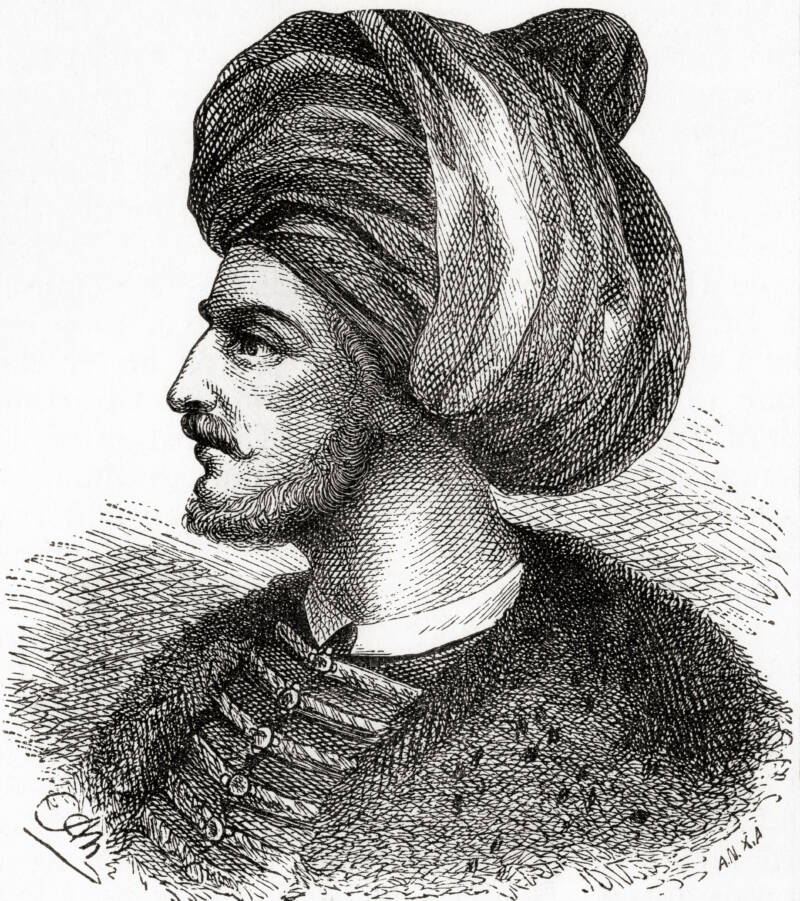
A painting of Mehmed the Conqueror, Ward and Lock's Illustrated History of the World.

Simultaneously, Mehmed II arrived before Negroponte by land with a force of 70 thousand soldiers. He gathered his ships on the part of the island closest to the land and built a bridge connecting the land and the island for three days. In this way, cannons could be transported to the island by horses.

Now the castle was surrounded by both sea and land, with one side of the sea route remaining open in front of the castle, where the defenders could more easily target enemy ships. For this reason, as was done for the fall of Constantinople, some of the ships were transported by land to the other side of the castle and thus that road was also closed.

The first attack on the castle started from the shore. The castle was well defend, including by very high walls built of chipped stones from the ground up and reinforced with lime and mortar. There was also a deep ditch dug on the beach side. The Ottomans placed numerous mortars, cannons, rifles and springs around the castle and bombarded. Despite efforts from the defenders to repair the walls, some were soon sufficiently damaged to allow an attack. The Venetian fleet attempted to come to the aid of the defenders, including by destroying the bridge between the island where the castle stood and the land, to little effect. The Venetian navy then entered the harbor and attempted to land soldiers to come to the aid of the garrison. A naval battle ensued, ending in Turkish victory, with the loss of several ships by the Venetians and the deaths of several of their captains, including Captain Zuan Longo and Zuan Tran. The Venetian commander, admiral Nicolò Canal, was severely criticized for his role in this defeat, leading to his dismissal and exile.

The siege continued for several days following the defeat of the Venetian relief force. The Turkish launched their final attack against the castle started on the night of Wednesday, July 11, 1470, and continued until the morning, and the castle fell on Thursday, July 12.

== Aftermath ==
Because the city had refused to surrender and was taken "by the sword", as was customary, the conquering Ottoman troops were given three days to plunder, loot, and pillage. The Christian men were slaughtered, while women and children were enslaved, and Venetian soldiers were executed. More than 6,000 Venetians and Greeks died in the defense of Negroponte. Only 30 known survivors made it back to Venice, consisting of 15 women, 12 children, and 3 men. There are various legends that the garrison commander, bailo Paolo Erizzo, was sawn in half. In fact, the prisoner of the siege Giovanni Maria Angiolello states that Paolo died in the first attack: "Pollo Erizzo, Bailo of the city, who was killed in the first onslaught, that is, at the defense of the Bourkos." Canal was tried, fined, stripped of his rank, and exiled to Portogruaro. Most of these stories are fictitious, though the suffering of the civilians in a city taken by force was quite real. For this reason, many places, like Athens, chose capitulation over resistance.

Refuges fleeing the siege established the settlement of Psachna on the Messapios river, north of Negroponte. Initially a small village, it has grown to be a town with considerable influence in the region.
