= Schiavetti =

Schiavetti (pronounced [skjaˈvetti]) is an Italian surname. Notable people with the surname include:

- Enrico Schiavetti (1920–1993), Italian footballer
- Igor Schiavetti (born 1976), Italian baseball player

== See also ==
- Schiaretti
- Schiavetta
- Schiavonetti
- Schiavone
- Schiavelli
