= Boa (clothing accessory) =

Long, elliptical neckpiece

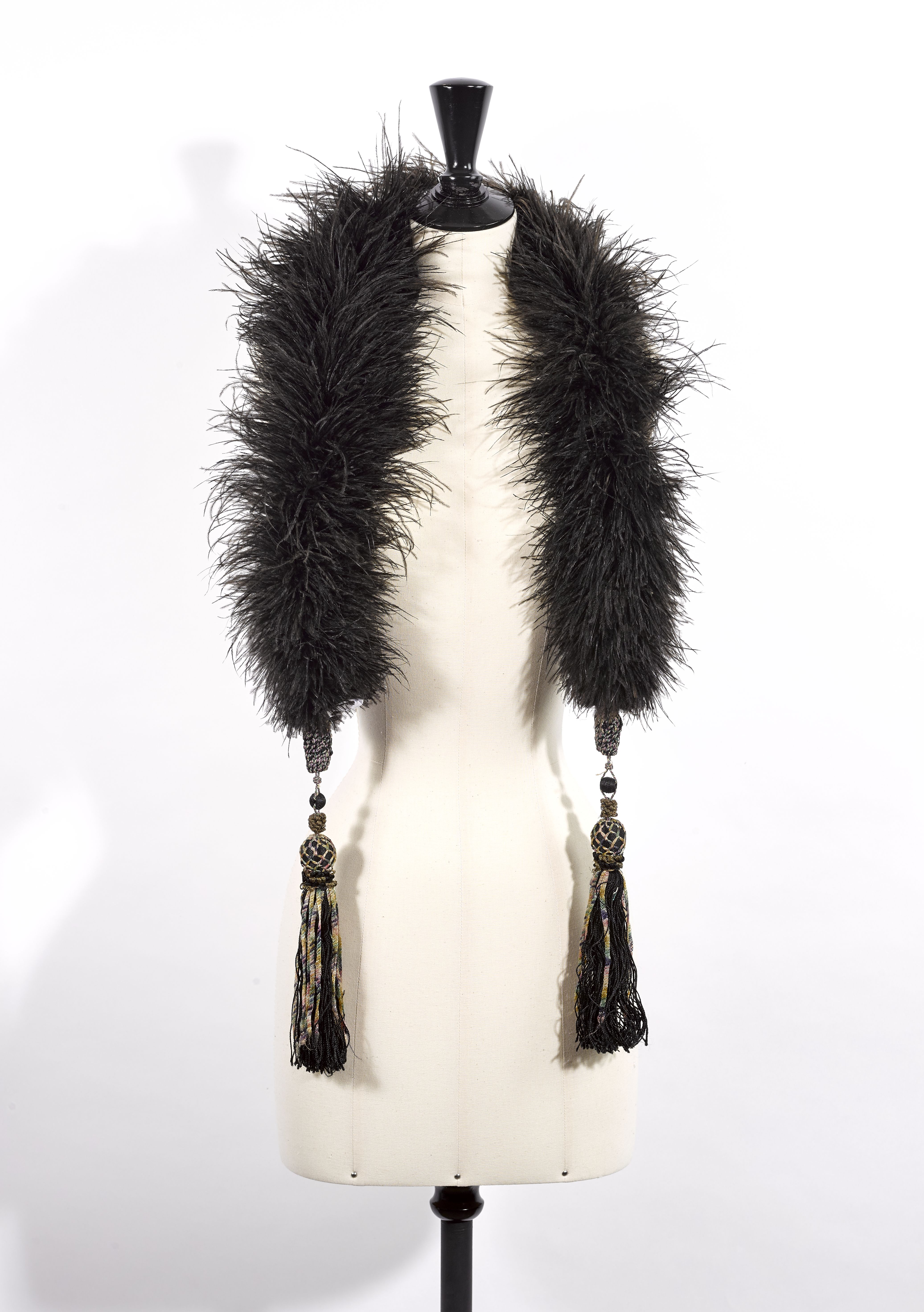
A black ostrich feather and silk boa

A boa is a fashion accessory that is usually worn wrapped around the neck like a scarf. Feather boas are most common, although modern boas are most often made with synthetic feathers.

== Construction ==
A boa can be made of fur, but it is usually made instead from various types of feathers. Ostrich, marabou stork, and turkey are the most common feathers used, although non-feather boas are also available. The feathers go through bleaching or dyeing processes and are glued and stitched into lengths called "ply". Sometimes more natural boas are produced. A lightweight chandelle boa might only weigh 65 grams (2.3 oz), whereas a 24 ply ostrich boa can weigh as much as 200 grams (7.1 oz). The more ply, the fluffier and thicker the boa. Boas are generally measured by weight (grams), length (centimetres), and ply. Boas are available through novelty, costume, or lingerie shops, as well as online.

With the development of "fun fur" or "eyelash" yarns in the late 20th century, an adept craftsperson can knit a boa of one solid color or a mix of various colors. Yarn boas do not "shed" like feather boas and are favored for their soft texture against the neck. The rounded boa shape is achieved by knitting one row and purling the next row, then repeating this pattern until reaching the desired length.

== Types ==
- Ostrich: thousands of long thin feather strands woven into ply are used to construct very fluffy boas. These form the larger, Las Vegas showgirl type boas, as when they are coloured and woven into many ply, they can look very dramatic even at a distance.
- Turkey: many larger flat turkey feathers form heavier boas which might weigh between 120 and 400 grams and reach 30 centimetres (12 in) in diameter.
  - Chandelle: smaller feathers or "flats" from the turkey are used to create lighter boas with smaller diameters.
- Marabou: the fine down from marabou is used to form very thin and very fluffy boas.

== History ==
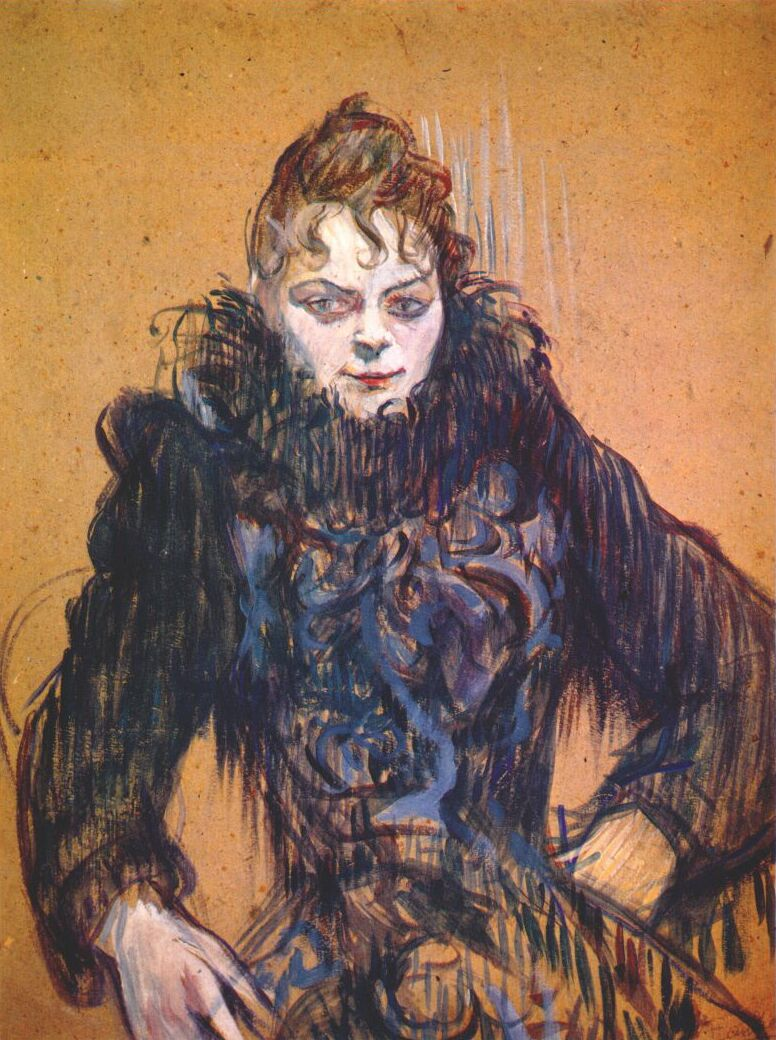
Woman with a black feather boa, c. 1892, by Henri de Toulouse-Lautrec

Feather boas have been documented for use as an adornment since at least 1820, but they might have been worn as early as the 17th century. Feather boas have fallen in and out of fashion many times over the years. Feather boas have had the reputation of being elegant as well as being considered campy or vulgar apparel.

Some historic eras where feather boas were in style or trendy include: the late Victorian era and Edwardian era (between 1890 and 1915), the 1920s, the 1970s during the glam rock and disco music eras, and in the rave scene of the 1990s.

Entertainers have long used feather boas as part of their act. A few feather boa wearers include: dancer Isadora Duncan; singer Shirley Bassey; actor/comedian Mae West; wrestlers Jesse Ventura, Superstar Billy Graham, and Hulk Hogan; singers Scott Weiland, Celia Cruz, Janis Joplin, Cher, Marc Bolan, Gerard Way, and Elton John; and numerous other opera and cabaret singers.

== Other uses ==
Social clubs such as the Red Hat Society, or those who are involved with historic re-enactment societies, wear boas at meetings while they are often worn as a costume accessory for parties around holiday seasons such as Halloween or Mardi Gras in New Orleans.

Feather boas are worn around campus by new members of the Mask & Wig Club at the University of Pennsylvania.

Feather boas are worn for erotic seduction purposes and are at times considered fetish wear. Nude performers may use boas to cover themselves while teasing their audience.

Feather boas are sometimes used as trims for skirts or tutus.

== See also ==
- Shawl
