= Schiavi (surname) =

Schiavi (Italian pronunciation: [ˈskjaːvi]) is an Italian surname. Notable people with the surname include:

- Alberto Schiavi (born 1939), West-German born Italian sprint canoer
- Bruno Schiavi (born 1972), Australian fashion designer and businessman
- Emilia Ferreiro Schiavi (1937–2023), Argentine pedagogue and writer
- Fabrizio Schiavi (born 1971), Italian graphic designer and type designer
- Juan Pablo Schiavi (born 1957), Argentine agronomist and politician
- Lea Schiavi (1907–1942), Italian dissident journalist
- Mark Schiavi (born 1964), English retired footballer
- Nicolás Schiavi (born 1995), Argentine footballer
- Raffaele Schiavi (born 1986), Italian footballer
- Rolando Schiavi (born 1973), Argentine retired footballer
- Viviana Schiavi (born 1982), Italian footballer

== See also ==
- Schiavo
