= Schiavelli =

Schiavelli (pronounced [skjaˈvɛlli]) is an Italian surname. Notable people with the surname include:

- George P. Schiavelli (1948–2019), United States federal judge
- Vincent Schiavelli (1948–2005), American character actor and food writer

== See also ==
- Schiavello
- Schiavetti
- Schiavone
