= Schiavoni =

Schiavoni (Italian pronunciation: [skjaˈvoːni]) may refer to:

== People ==
- The plural of Schiavone, a former ethnonym in Italy now surviving as a surname
  - Molise Croats

=== People with the surname ===
- Alfredo Schiavoni (born 1963), Argentine politician
- Alice Schiavoni Bosio (1871–1931), Italian suffragette
- Claudio Schiavoni (born 1960), Italian racing driver and co-founder of Iron Lynx
- Felice Schiavoni (1803–1881), Italian painter
- Giovanni Schiavoni (1804–1848), Italian painter and art professor
- Humberto Schiavoni (born 1958), Argentine lawyer and politician
- Joe Schiavoni (born 1979) American politician and judge
- Matteo Schiavoni (born 2005), Canadian soccer player
- Natale Schiavoni (1777–1858), Italian painter and engraver
- T. John Schiavoni, American politician

== Places ==
- Ginestra degli Schiavoni, a municipality in Campania, Italy
- Riva degli Schiavoni, a waterfront in Venice, Italy
- San Giacomo degli Schiavoni, a municipality in Molise, Italy
- San Giorgio degli Schiavoni, a former confraternity in Venice, Italy
- San Girolamo dei Croati, formerly San Girolamo degli Schiavoni, a Croatian church in Rome, Italy

== See also ==
- Schiavon (surname)
