= Schiavonetti =

Schiavonetti (pronounced [skjavoˈnetti]) is an Italian surname. Notable people with the surname include:

- Elisabetta Pilotti-Schiavonetti (1680–1742), Italian operatic soprano
- Luigi Schiavonetti (1765–1810) and Niccolò Schiavonetti (1771–1813), Italian reproductive engravers and etchers

== See also ==
- Schiavetti
- Schiavone
