= Lucio Schiavon =

Italian illustrator (born 1976)

Lucio Schiavon (born 1976) is an Italian illustrator.

== Biography ==
Lucio Schiavon was born in Venice Italy. He has collaborated with Fabrica research centre of Benetton Group's communication departments in the Visual Communication & Illustration and Comics. During this period contributes to the project Vision of Hope for The New Yorker magazine. It works on various initiatives and reality as El Pais, Reporters Without Borders, UNICEF and the Teatro Massimo in Palermo. He has also worked with magazines such as International, Specchio della Stampa, Linea Grafica and Mondadori. His works have been exhibited in two group of Fabrica, one in Japan in Tokyo and Osaka as part of the exhibition From chaos to order and back to Barcelona in Spain and with the exposure of the shows “ Mail me” that were later made of the publications for the catalog Electa. He has worked with the Venice Biennale, where he created and managed the marketing and publicity materials of various international festivals. How Illustrator public with the publishing house and art gallery in Milan Nuages, Io gran gatta lui e il Super (2007) Oltre an El mostro and Carnet from Togo (2009). For other publishers, Io Hubble e il cielo (2008), Il genio del Bosco (2009), Gerardo e strane visioni (2009) and unpublished postcards Venice (2010). Create and design a new line characters to the collection Invicta backpacks and school works treating the materials with Helly Hansen Workware advertising, Carhartt Workware, Brionvega, Autostrade and Ovs where he created a character for the fundraising campaign for Save the Children.

He has exhibited his work in various group exhibitions in Paris all’Ecoles de Mines in Naples at the Palace of Arts, the Museum of the landscape of Torre di Mosto and space Lamech in the Palladian Basilica in Vicenza. Participating in the Biennale of Carnet de Voyage in Clermont Ferrand in France and subsequently in the group show “Invitation du Vojage” curated by Cristina Taverna in Varese to the Cloister of Voltorre alongside artists like Hugo Pratt, Jose Munoz, JJ Sempé, Tullio Pericoli, Jaques Loustal and Lorenzo Mattotti. Produce animated shorts for the Venice Film Meeting (2008) and unpublished postcards Venice (2010). Collaborates with the city of Venice as an illustrator, creating posters for various exhibitions and cultural events on film. In 2009 he was chosen to participate in the international catalog of American Illustration No. 29 (New York) for the best works of 2009. At the end of 2010 inaugurates “La gemella diversa” exhibition dedicated to the relationship between the mainland and Venice, his first solo exhibition at Fondazione Bevilacqua La Masa in Venice. Collaborates with director Enzo D’Alo and artist Lorenzo Mattotti for the backgrounds of animated feature “Pinocchio” (2011) With Heads Collective has created a dog “Oscar” for Oscar Mondadori treating the promotional materials and TV commercials (2012). He later worked for Fiat, Corio Shopville Le Gru and the Armando Testa agency for the Museo del risparmio of Turin (2012). Selected at First International Motion Art Award 2012 in New York City with the video “Grukey cards”.
