= La Schiavona =

Painting by Titian

Portrait of a Lady
- La Schiavona (Italian)
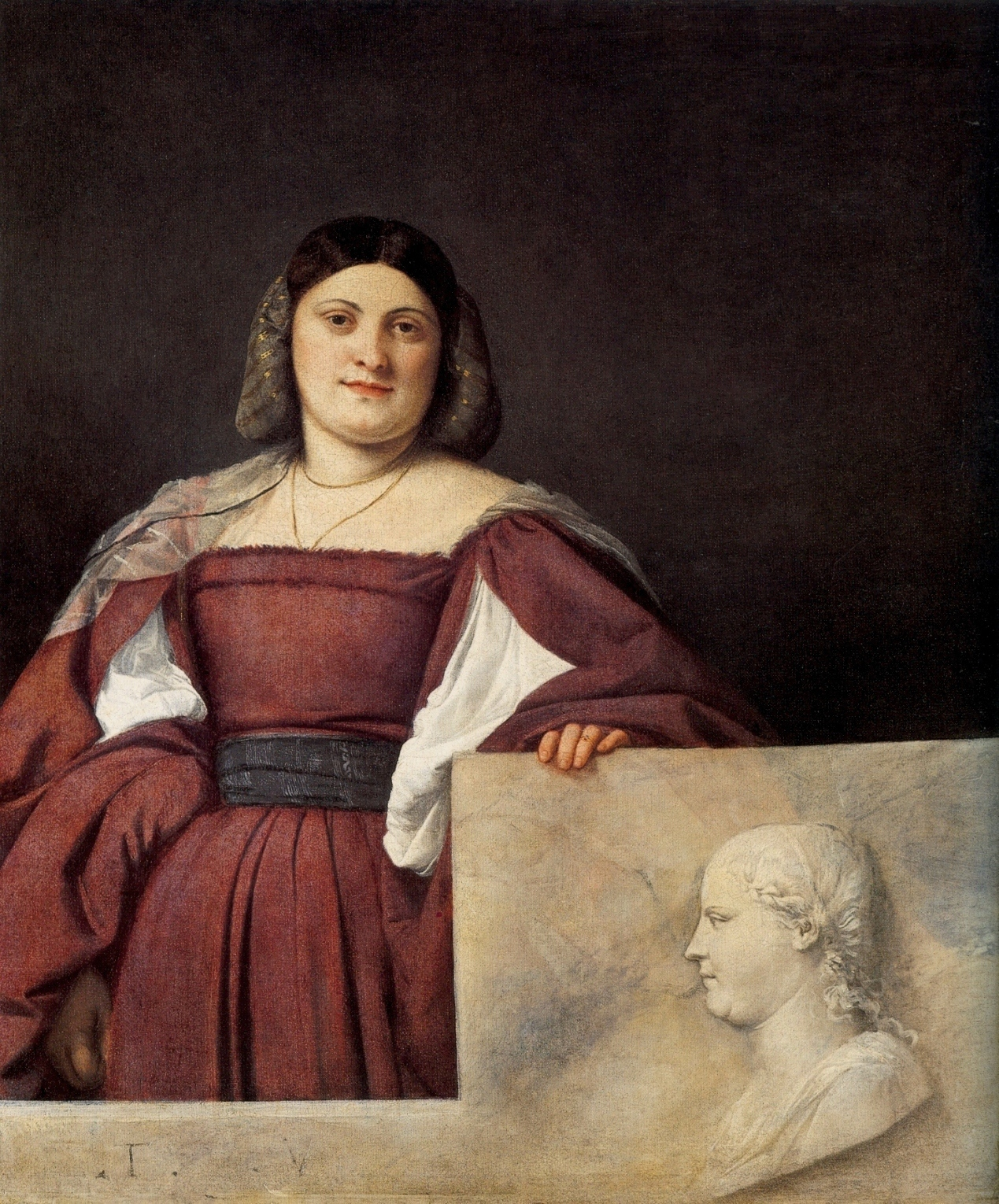
- Artist: Titian
- Year: 1510–12
- Medium: Oil on canvas
- Dimensions: 119.4 cm × 96.5 cm (47.0 in × 38.0 in)
- Location: National Gallery, London

La Schiavona ('The Woman from Dalmatia'), also known as Portrait of a Lady, is a 1510–1512 portrait by Titian of an unknown woman, held at the National Gallery in London.

== Identity of the sitter ==
The painting was being referred to as La Schiavona before the beginning of the seventeenth century. However, this name is traditional, given to the painting by someone in recognition of the style of her dress and her physiognomy. In reality, the lady portrayed would have been part of the nobility of the time, with a costume compatible with that of the wealthy women of the territories controlled by the Republic of Venice. Some people have tried to identify the woman as Catherine Cornaro, a hypothesis without any confirmation. Previously assigned to Giorgione, the painting is today commonly accepted as a youthful masterpiece by Titian; further evidence is provided by the absence of the modulated sweetness of the painter from Castelfranco Veneto, replaced rather by a pulsating vitality. There are also close similarities with the woman protagonist of the Miracolo del neonato, a Paduan fresco by Titian dating back to 1511.

== Description ==
This composition was drastically rehandled by Titian somewhere about the year 1540, the face and neck and the red drapery being entirely repainted, with the result that the colour is now rather dead and heavy. The subject is shown three-quarter length against a plain grey background. Her curvaceous form is portrayed with exceptional realism and accuracy, and is accentuated by the wide drapery of her earth-coloured dress. The body is rotated slightly, while the head looks frontally at the viewer, in a pose of remarkable naturalness and ease. What appears to be the same woman is seen in relief (inspired by ancient cameos) on a raised section of the parapet. The lower part of the parapet is original, though the raised section appears to be a revision by Titian himself, with the drapery painted under it still being visible through subsequent layers of paint. The painting is signed TV on the parapet, which probably stands for Tiziano Vecellio.

== History ==
The portrait was presented to the National Gallery in London in 1942 by Sir Francis Cook, 4th Baronet, in memory of his father Herbert, via the Art Fund – it is still in the Gallery's collection, as NG5385.

From October 2009 to January 2010, La Schiavona was loaned to the Henry Moore Institute in Leeds to be shown as part of an exhibition called "Sculpture in Painting".

== See also ==
- List of works by Titian

== Bibliography ==
- Francesco Valcanover, L'opera completa di Tiziano, Rizzoli, Milano 1969.
