= Tomaso Schiavo =

Tomaso Schiavo or Thomaso Schiavo di Lebano (Italian: Tommaso Schiavo; "Thomas the Slav"; fl. 1470) was a Venetian Dalmatian captain and mercenary commander that participated in the Ottoman–Venetian War (1463–79). He commanded a mercenary unit numbering 500 men largely recruited from Dalmatia. During the 1470 Ottoman siege of Venetian Negroponte the Venetians uncovered that he had sent envoys to the Ottomans; a deep conspiracy was unearthed and Schiavo's associates were arrested. His brother was tortured to death, giving up plans of an Ottoman attack. Schiavo, unknowing, was summoned by Erizzo and then killed.
