= Portrait of Madame Ingres =

Painting by Jean-Auguste-Dominique Ingres

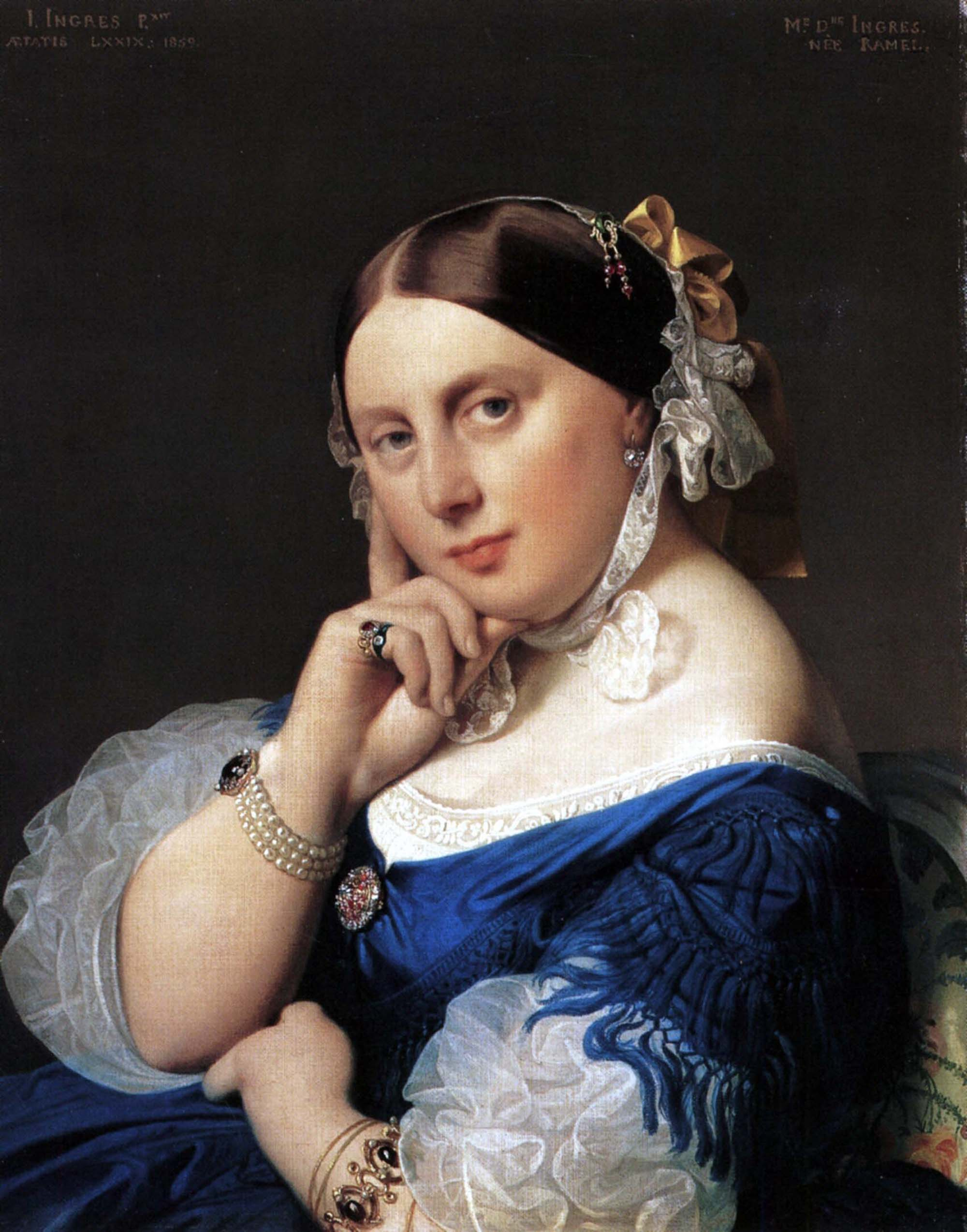
Ingres, Portrait of Madame Ingres, 1859, 121.3 x 90.8cm. Am Römerholz, Switzerland

Portrait of Madame Ingres is a late period oil on canvas painting by the French Neoclassical artist Jean-Auguste-Dominique Ingres, completed in 1859. Depicting his second wife, Delphine Ramel (he had been widowed in 1849), it is Ingres' final painted portrait, apart from two self-portraits. It was probably painted to accompany Ingres's self-portrait of the same year, now in the Fogg Art Museum, Boston.

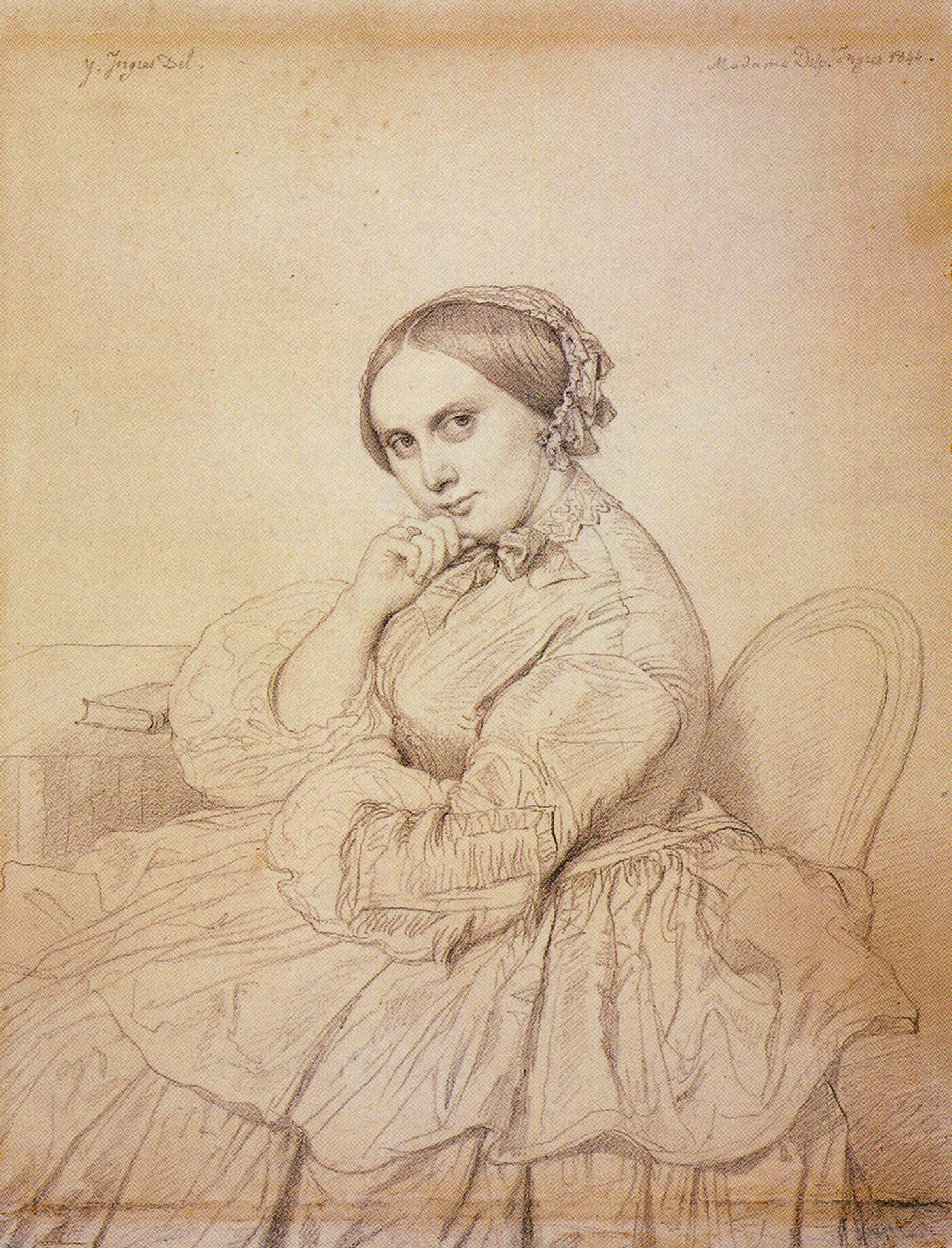
Portrait of Delphine Ramel, 1855, Fogg Art Museum

Delphine was the daughter of Dominique Ramel (1777–1860) and the niece of Charles Marcotte d'Argenteuil. She is presented as warm and engaging, devoid of the upper-class pretensions that marked most of his other female portraits from his late period. Ingres depicted her in the same pose in a drawing dated 1855 in the Fogg Art Museum.

== Sources ==
- Brettell, Richard R., Paul Hayes Tucker, and Natalie H. Lee. 2009. Nineteenth- and Twentieth-century Paintings. New York: Metropolitan Museum of Art. p. 14. ISBN 978-0-6911-4536-5
- Wolohojian, Stephan (ed). "A Private Passion: 19th-Century Paintings and Drawings from the Grenville L. Winthrop Collection, Harvard University". NY: Metropolitan Museum of Art, 2003. ISBN 978-1-5883-9076-9
- Tinterow, Gary. Portraits by Ingres: Image of an Epoch. New York: Metropolitan Museum of Art, 1999. ISBN 978-0-300-08653-9
