= Marabou (fashion) =

Down feather garment trim

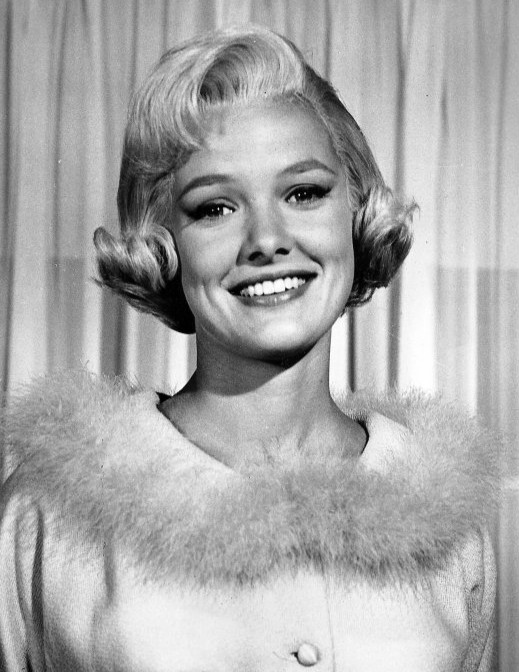
Suit with a marabou collar worn by Beverley Owen in 1964

Marabou (historically spelled marabout) describes a certain type of down feather trimming. Although it takes its name from the marabou stork whose undertail down once provided the feathers, white turkey feathers have been used as a substitute. The advantage of marabou is that it takes dye well, making it a very versatile trimming for dress, and makes an effective substitute for fur. While marabou has been widely used as a fashion trimming since the late 19th century, it is also often used in fly tying for making up the lures ('flies') used for fly fishing.

== In fashion ==
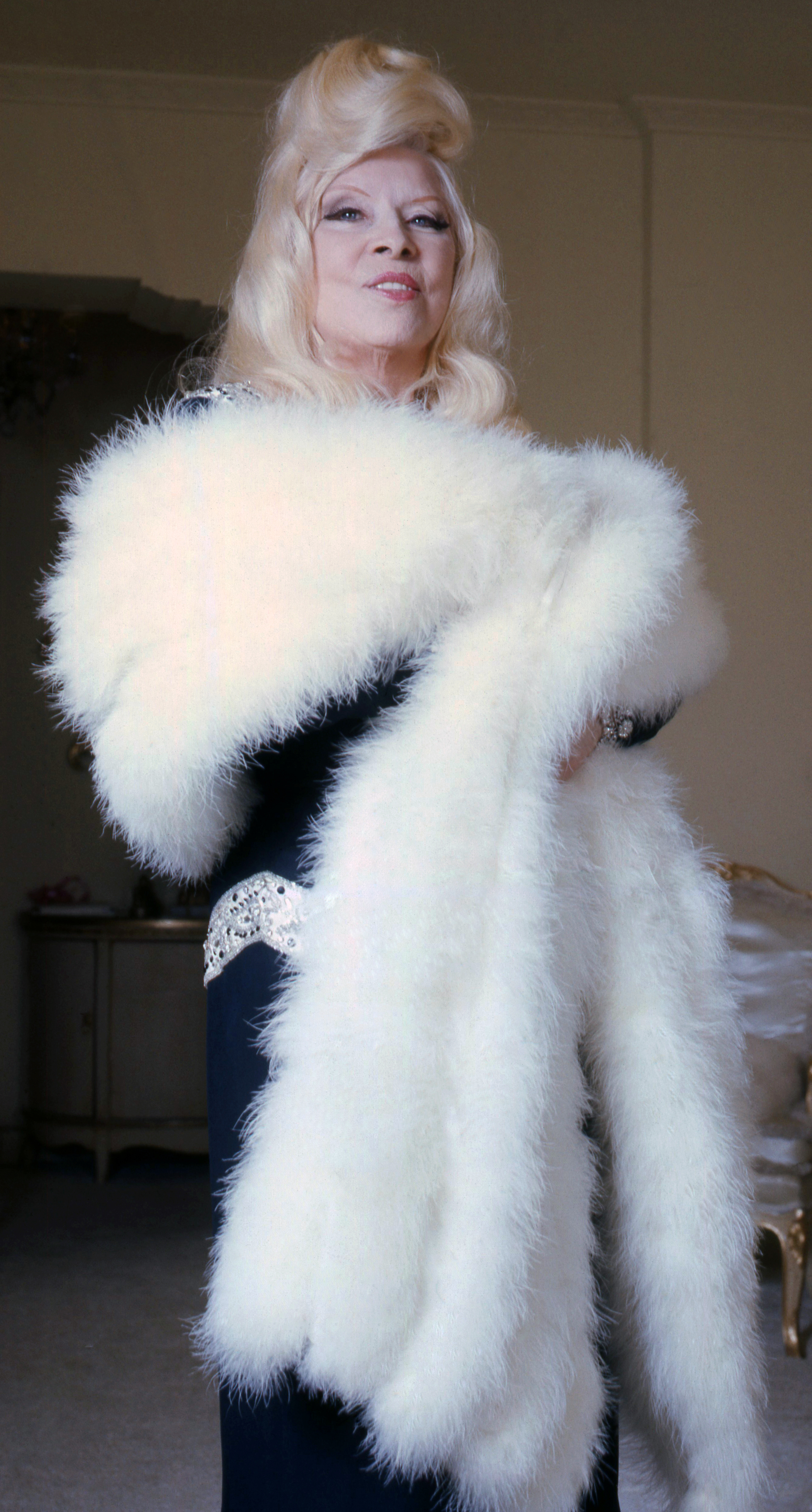
White marabou boa worn by Mae West in 1973.

"Marabout" was a very popular trimming from the late eighteenth century onwards. It was used for trimming hats and making up muffs and feather boas. The Great Exhibition of 1851 prominently featured marabout alongside other feathers as second only in popularity to ostrich feathers, and it was noted that white marabout was sometimes very scarce, and also that some manufacturers were making highly commended items from turkey and goose-down.

Since the 20th century, marabou (spelt without a T) has become associated with lingerie and sex appeal. The Metropolitan Museum states that 'no object better epitomizes the sex kitten glamour of the 1950s than the marabou mule'. Marabou mules are popularly associated with glamorous 1950s actresses such as Marilyn Monroe, who wore them in The Seven Year Itch.
