= Portrait of Charles Marcotte =

Painting by Jean-Auguste-Dominique Ingres

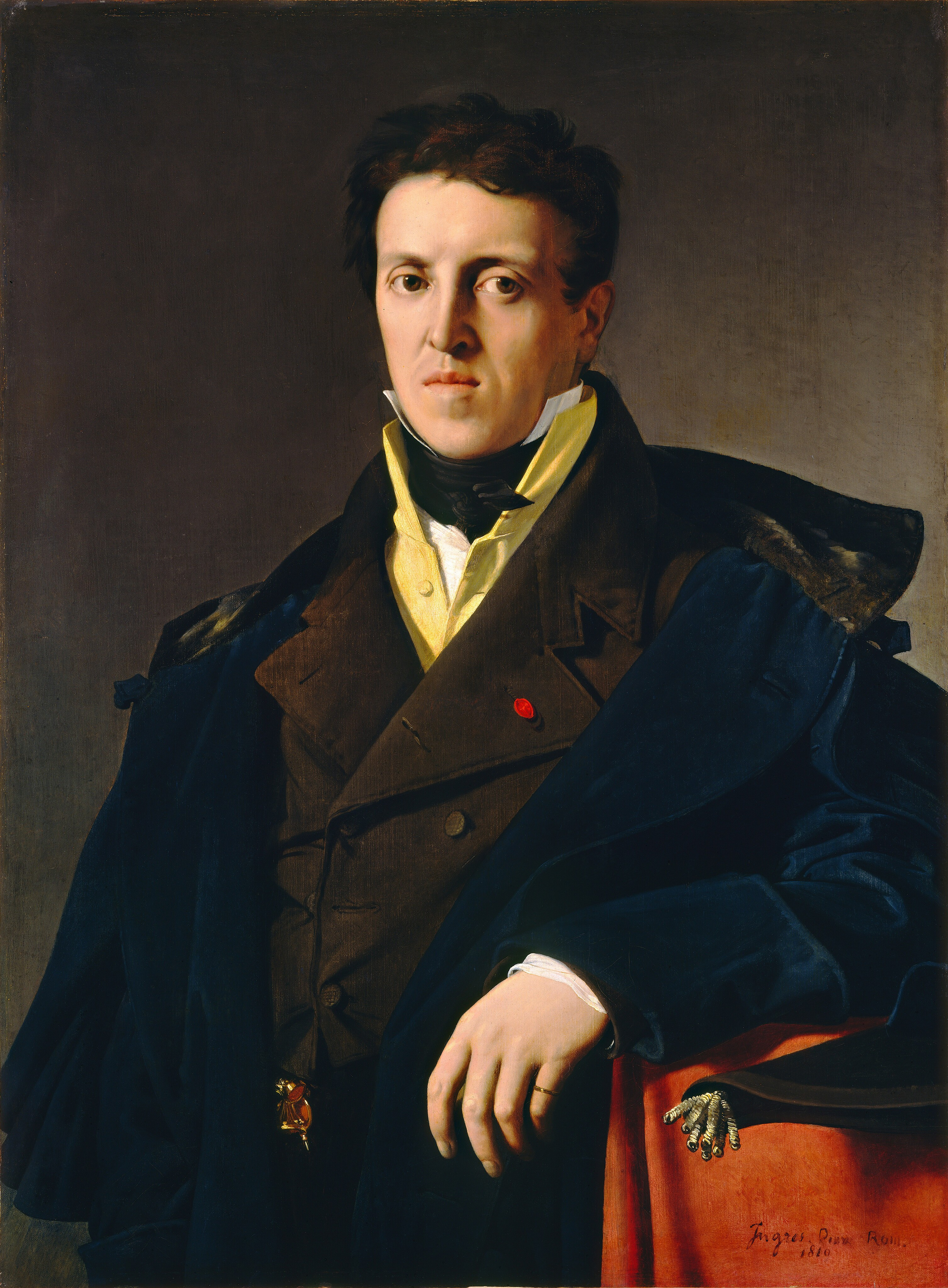
- Artist: Jean-Auguste-Dominique Ingres
- Year: 1810
- Type: Oil-on-canvas
- Dimensions: 93.7 cm × 69.4 cm (36.9 in × 27.3 in)
- Location: National Gallery of Art, Washington, D.C.

Portrait of Charles Marcotte (also known as Marcotte d'Argenteuil) is an 1810 oil on canvas painting by the French Neoclassical artist Jean-Auguste-Dominique Ingres, completed during the artist's first stay in Rome.

Charles Marie Jean Baptiste Marcotte (1773–1864) was 36 or 37 years old when the portrait was painted, and serving as inspector general for Waters and Forests in the Napoleonic department of Rome. Marcotte was one of the most significant French patrons of the arts in the 19th century and was a loyal supporter friend and adviser to Ingres. Over the years, he commissioned Ingres to paint several portraits of his family, friends and his mistress, as well as works such as Odalisque with Slave (1839).

Ingres signed and dated the painting on the lower right, over the red cloth. The painting is in the collection of the National Gallery of Art, Washington, D.C.

== Description ==
Although handsome and possessing a strong bone structure, Marcotte is portrayed as dour and serious, dressed in an imposing military uniform, and given a stern facial expression, with tightly pursed lips, which are turned down at the corners. A number of art historians have noted how his stiffness resembles Ingres' own early self-portraits, particularly that of 1804.

Marcotte stands against a plain grey-green background, leaning against a table draped with a red cloth. His stiff, starched white and yellow neck collar appears tight and restrictive. He wears a blue carrick with a cape and velvet collar over a white shirt and yellow waistcoat. Affectionately, his hair appears ruffled, which somewhat breaks the overall grim and morose tone. Special attention is given to his claw-like left hand, with its long sinuous fingers, the shape of which is echoed by the tassels protruding from the bicorne beside him.

== Provenance ==
Marcotte commissioned the portrait as a gift to his mother. He did not like the final painting and found it too stern, a fact that Ingres asked him to keep to himself. It remained in Marcotte's possession until his death in 1864, after which it passed to his son Joseph, and then to his widow, and to his daughter Élisabeth Pougin de la Maisonneuve until 1935. It was acquired by Samuel H. Kress in 1949, and gifted to the National Gallery of Art in 1952.

== See also ==
- List of paintings by Jean-Auguste-Dominique Ingres

== Sources ==
- Conisbee, Philip (1999). "26. Charles-Marie-Jean-Babptiste Marcotte (Marcotte d'Argenteuil)". In Tinterow, Gary; Conisbee, Philip (eds.). Portraits by Ingres : image of an epoch. New York: Metropolitan Museum of Art : Distributed by Harry N. Abrams. pp. 122–125. ISBN 978-0-87099-890-4. OCLC 40135348 – via Metropolitan Museum of Art.
- Rosenblum, Robert (1990) [1956]. Jean-Auguste-Dominique Ingres. New York: Abrams. ISBN 978-0-8109-3451-1. OCLC 473589529.
