= Broglie =

Broglie may refer to:

- House of Broglie, a French noble family whose members include:
  - Albert de Broglie, 4th Duke of Broglie (1821–1901), Prime Minister of France
  - Amédée de Broglie (1849-1917)
  - Auguste-Théodore-Paul de Broglie (1834-1895), professor of apologetics
  - Charles François de Broglie, Marquis of Ruffec (1719-1781), French Royal Army officer and diplomat
  - François Marie de Broglie, 1st Duke of Broglie (1671-1745), French Royal Army officer and diplomat
  - Gabriel de Broglie (1931–2025), French historian and politician
  - Jean de Broglie (1921–1976), French politician
  - Louis de Broglie (1892–1987), French physicist and Nobel laureate
    - Atomic de Broglie microscope
    - de Broglie–Bohm theory
    - de Broglie wave, the wave-form manifestation of particles of matter
    - de Broglie Wave-Particle Duality
    - de Broglie wavelength
    - Thermal de Broglie wavelength
  - Louise de Broglie, Countess d'Haussonville (1818-1882), French essayist and biographer
  - Maurice de Broglie, 6th Duke of Broglie (1875-1960), French physicist
  - Maurice-Jean de Broglie (1766–1821), French aristocrat and bishop
  - Philippe Maurice de Broglie, 9th Duke of Broglie (born 1960), French aristocrat
  - Victor de Broglie (disambiguation), multiple people
- Broglie, Eure, a commune of the Eure département, France
- Place Broglie, the central town square in Strasbourg, France

== See also ==
- 30883 de Broglie, a minor planet
- Fondation Louis-de-Broglie, a French foundation for research into physics
- French ship Maréchal de Broglie (1774)
- The Princesse de Broglie, a painting of Pauline de Broglie dated 1851-1853 by Jean-Auguste-Dominique Ingres
