= Victor de Broglie =

Victor de Broglie may refer to:

- Victor-Maurice, comte de Broglie, (1647–1727), French soldier and general
- Victor François de Broglie, 2nd Duke of Broglie (1718–1804), French soldier
- Victor de Broglie, Prince of Broglie (1756–1794), French soldier and politician
- Victor de Broglie (1785–1870), 3rd duc de Broglie, French statesman and diplomat
- Victor de Broglie (1846–1906), 5th duc de Broglie, French politician and diplomat
- Victor-François, 8th duc de Broglie (1949–2012))

== See also ==
- House of Broglie
