= Marie Célestine Amélie d'Armaillé =

French writer, biographer and historian

Marie Célestine Amélie d'Armaillé Comtesse d'Armaillé
- Born: Marie Célestine Amélie de Ségur; 8 January 1830; Paris, France
- Died: 7 December 1918 (aged 88); 8th arrondissement of Paris, France
- Occupations: writer; biographer; historian
- Spouse(s): Louis de La Forest d'Armaillé, Comte d'Armaillé (m. 1851; died 1882)
- Children: Pauline Célestine de La Forest d'Armaillé
- Parent: Philippe Paul, comte de Ségur
- Relatives: Louis de Broglie & Maurice de Broglie (grandsons); Victor de Broglie (son-in-law)
- Writing career
- Pen name: Mme La Csse D'Armaillé; La Comtesse D'Armaillé née de Ségur
- Language: French
- Subject: French women
- Notable awards: Montyon Prize

Marie Célestine Amélie d'Armaillé (née, de Ségur; known as the Comtesse d'Armaillé; 8 January 1830 – 7 December 1918) was a French writer, biographer, and historian. In 1887, she was a recipient of the Montyon Prize from the Académie Française, for the biography, Madame Élisabeth, sœur de Louis XVI. Armaillé died in 1918.

== Early life ==
Marie Célestine Amélie de Ségur (or Célestine Marie Amélie, according to her birth certificate) was born on January 8, 1830, in the former 1st arrondissement of Paris, under the reign of Charles X. She was the daughter of Philippe Paul, comte de Ségur, French general and historian of the Revolution and the Empire, peer of France and academician, and of Célestine Gabrielle de Ventimiglia du Luc.

== Career ==
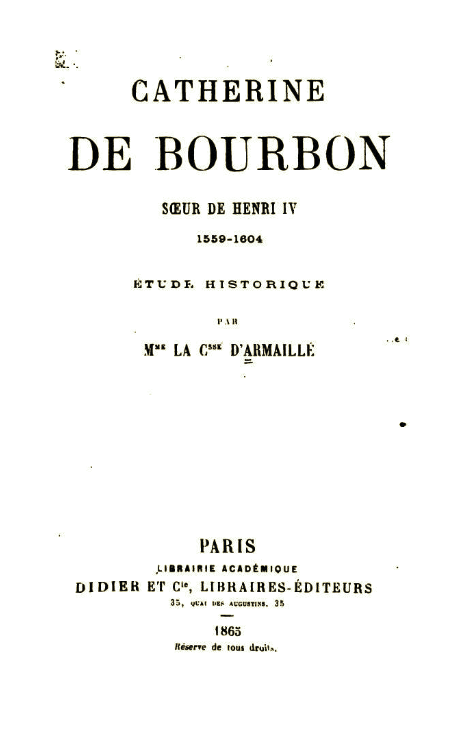
Catherine de Bourbon (1865)

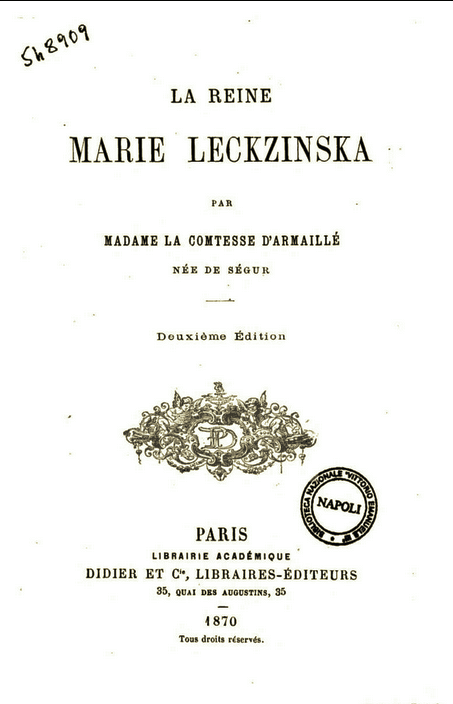
La reine Marie Leckzinska (2nd ed., 1870)

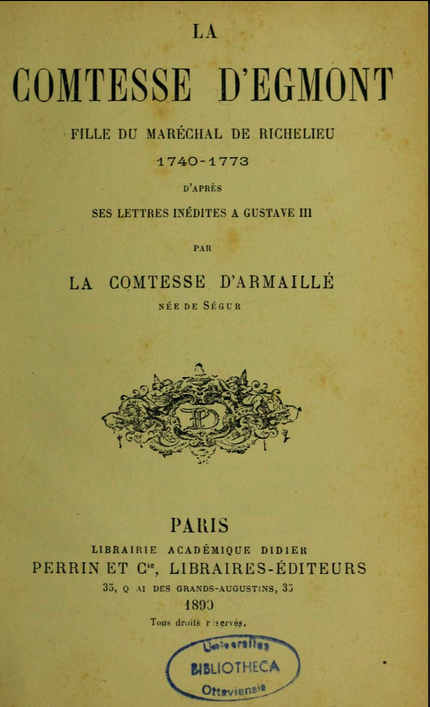
La Comtesse d'Egmont (1890)

Faithful to the traditions of her family, she was interested in historical and literary matters. Moreover, she brought together a society that shared her interests. She began to publish in 1864 with a study on the Queen of France, Marie Leszczyńska, wife of King Louis XV, which earned her the privilege of an article by the French literary critic Charles Augustin Sainte-Beuve.

She then continued with several other works on French noble women: Catherine de Bourbon, sister of King Henri IV, in 1865; Marie Antoinette and her daughter, Marie-Thérèse, in 1870; Élisabeth of France (known as Madame Elisabeth), in 1886, for which she received an award from the French Academy; Jeanne-Sophie de Vignerot du Plessis (known as Septimanie d'Egmont), in 1890; and finally, Désirée Clary, in 1897.

Around the age of 69, she began to evoke the memories of her career through a memoir, voluntarily limiting herself to the first thirty years, from 1830 to 1860.

== Personal life ==
In 1851, she married Louis de La Forest d'Armaillé, Comte d'Armaillé, thus taking the title of "Comtesse d'Armaillé", while also being known as "Marie Célestine Amélie de La Forest d'Armaillé". She was widowed in 1882. Their daughter, Pauline-Célestine-Louise, married Prince Victor de Broglie on September 28, 1871. Pauline and Victor had six children, including Maurice (1875–1960), an experimental physicist, and Louis (1892–1987), who would win the Nobel Prize in Physics (1929).

The Spanish flu pandemic broke out in 1918 and d'Armaillé died of the consequences of this illness, on 7 December of the same year, then aged 88, in her home in the Square de Messine (now, rue du Docteur-Lancereaux) in the 8th arrondissement of Paris. Her funeral was celebrated on 11 December, in the Saint-Philippe-du-Roule church, in the same arrondissement.

== Awards ==
- 1887, Montyon Prize, for Madame Élisabeth, sœur de Louis XVI

== Publications ==
- 1864, La reine Marie Leckzinska, étude historique (text)
- 1865, Catherine de Bourbon, soeur de Henri IV, 1559-1604, étude historique (text)
- 1870, Marie-Thérèse et Marie-Antoinette (text)
- 1886, Madame Élisabeth, soeur de Louis XVI (text)
- 1890, La comtesse d'Egmont, fille du maréchal de Richelieu (1740-1773) d'après ses lettres inédites à Gustave III (text)
- 1897, Une Fiancée de Napoléon. Désirée Clary, reine de Suède, 1777-1860
- 1933, Souvenirs de jeunesse de la comtesse d’Armaillé, née Ségur
- 1934, Quand on savait vivre heureux (1830-1860)
- 1934, Souvenirs de Célestine de Vintimille
- 1935, Souvenirs d’enfance du général de Ségur
- 2012, Quand on savait vivre heureux (1830-1860)
