= Éric Yung =

French journalist (1948–2024)

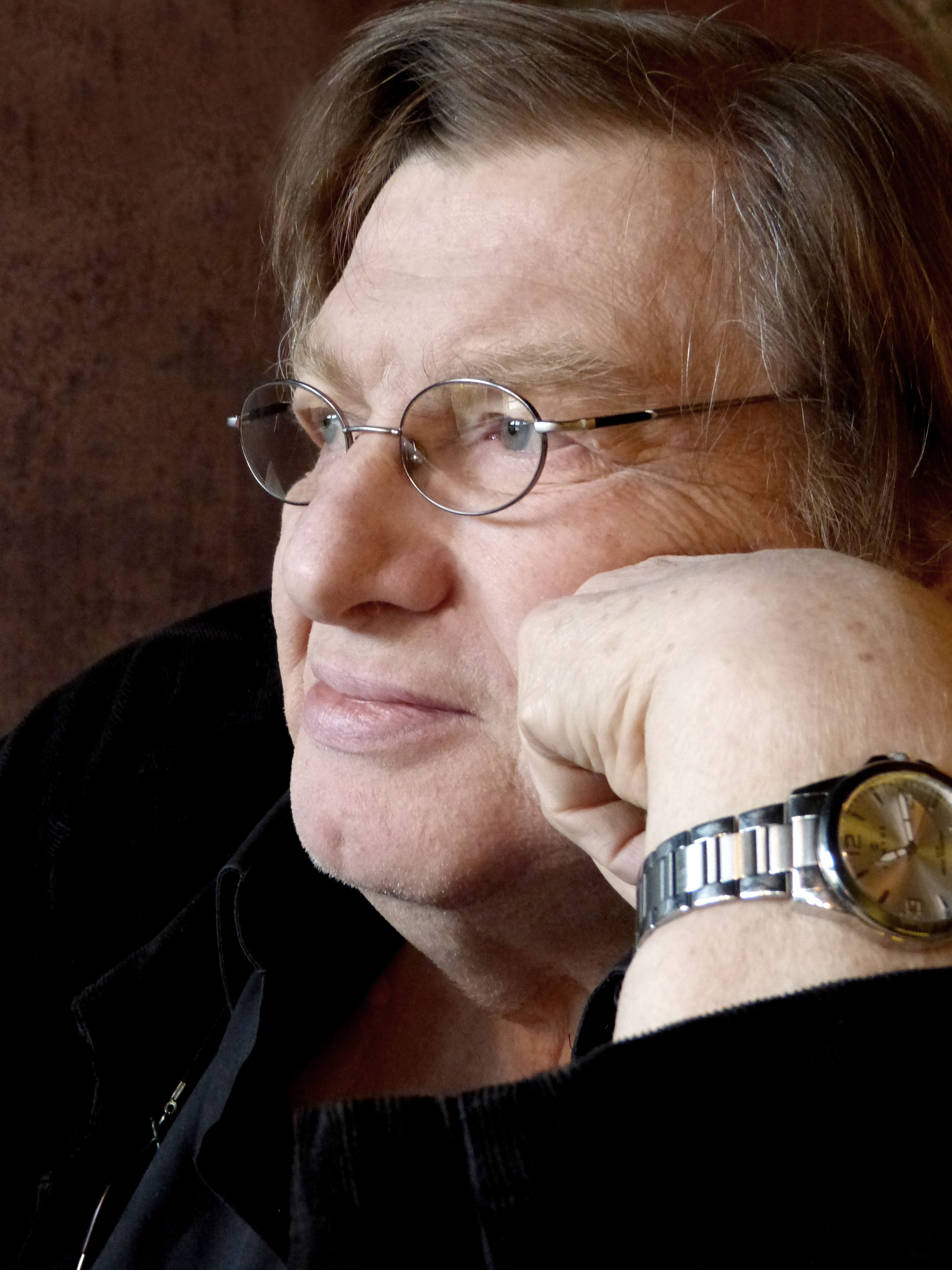
- Yung in 2016
- Born: Jean-Bernard Vincent; 30 March 1948; Abbeville, France
- Died: 20 October 2024 (aged 76)
- Occupation: Journalist

Jean-Bernard Vincent (30 March 1948 – 20 October 2024), better known by the pen name Éric Yung, was a French journalist who had previously worked as a police investigator.

A member of the Search and Intervention Brigade, he turned to journalism in 1980 and worked for France Inter as well as several radio stations.

== Biography ==
Born in Abbeville on 30 March 1948, Yung grew up in a communist family from Picardy. Throughout his life, he had five children with four different women. From 1969 to 1978, he worked as a police officer, serving in the Search and Intervention Brigade within the Paris Police Prefecture as an anti-gang agent. In this role, he conducted surveillance in response to threats on the life of Jean de Broglie, who would be assassinated in 1976. Following disagreements with the National Police and an attempt on his life alongside that of his roommate Yves Mourousi on 31 August 1978, he left the agency.

In 1980, Yung joined Le Quotidien de Paris, a newspaper owned by Philippe Tesson. He then became a senior editor at Les Nouvelles littéraires before joining France Inter. Following the closure of Les Nouvelles littéraires, he began working for Le Matin de Paris and the weekly magazine VSD. He also made numerous television appearances including on Michel Field's show, Field dans ta chambre.

In addition to his journalistic pursuits, Yung staged an exhibition titled "La science mène l'enquête" at the Palais de la Découverte in Paris, which welcomed over one million visitors. He also organized the exhibition "Landru - 6h10 - Temps clair (Les pièces du dossier)" at the Musée des Lettres et Manuscrits.

Yung died on 20 October 2024, at the age of 76.

== Decorations ==
- Knight of the Ordre des Arts et des Lettres (2013)

== Publications ==
- La Tentation de l'ombre
- Le diable est un assassin
- Du cambriolage considéré comme l'un des beaux arts
- Un silence coupable
- Les Nouvelles Archives de l'étrange
- Mon ami le bourreau
- Landru - 6h10 - Temps clair (Les pièces du dossier) (2013)
- Escroqueries légendaires et autres histoires de la délinquance astucieuses (2016)
- L'Assassin et son bourreau (2017)
- Les Archives de l'insolite (2018)
- Charles Manson et l'assassinat de Sharon Tate (2019)
- Five Points (2022)
