= Philippe Tesson =

French journalist (1928–2023)

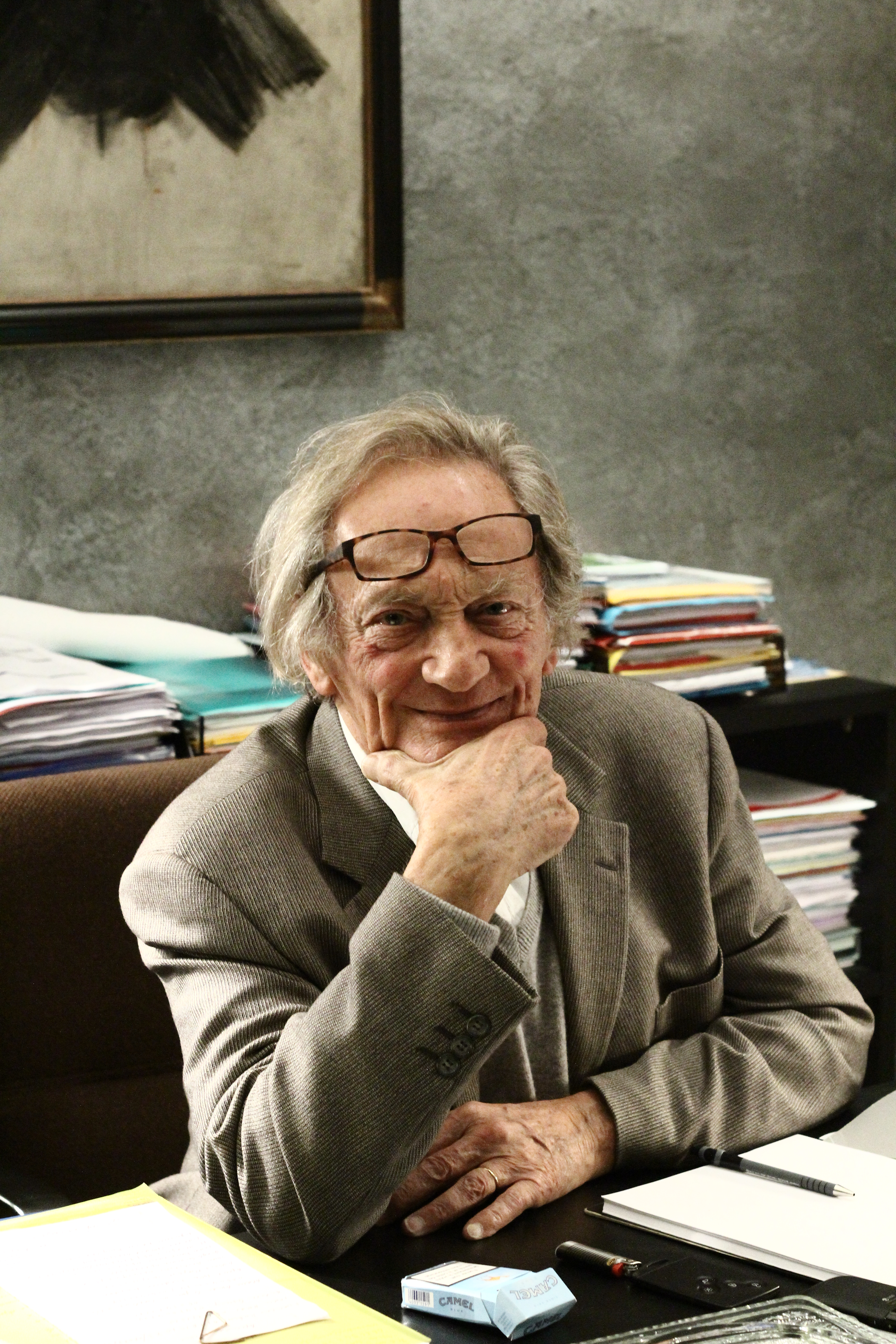
- Tesson in 2013
- Born: Philippe Marcel Tesson; 1 March 1928; Wassigny, Aisne, France
- Died: 1 February 2023 (aged 94); Chatou, France
- Education: Collège Stanislas de Paris
- Alma mater: Sciences Po
- Occupation: Journalist
- Employer(s): Le Figaro; Le Canard Enchaîné
- Spouse: Marie-Claude Millet (m. 1969)
- Children: Stéphanie; Sylvain Tesson; Daphné

Philippe Tesson (1 March 1928 – 1 February 2023) was a French journalist and television columnist who primarily focused on theatre. In 1974, he founded the newspaper Le Quotidien de Paris, of which he was the owner and director of publication until 1994. He was also owner of the publishing house L'Avant-scène théâtre and the Théâtre de Poche-Montparnasse in Paris.

== Biography ==
Born in Wassigny on 1 March 1928, Tesson spent his childhood in the Thiérache region. During the German occupation of France, his father, Albert Tesson, was arrested. After World War II, he attended secondary school in Le Cateau alongside Pierre Mauroy. He then worked as a secretary of debate in the National Assembly when he was invited to work alongside Henri Smadja.

At the age of 30, Tesson became editor-in-chief of the newspaper Combat, a position he held from 1960 to 1974. After leaving Combat, he brought a large number of editorial staff with him to the newspaper he founded, Le Quotidien de Paris. The controversial paper was open to all opinions and political ideologies, and he became director of publication and owner in April 1974. Financial problems led the newspaper to temporarily cease operations in 1978. When it reappeared the following year, it now held liberal views. The Groupe Quotidien, which employed more than 550 people and owned Le Quotidien de Paris and Le Quotidien du Médecin, debuted Le Quotidien du pharmacien, L'Action économique, and Paris au quotidien.

Tesson directed Le Quotidien de Paris until his publication ceased for good in 1994, primarily due to the beginning of the downfall of written press. During his time as owner of the newspaper, he also directed the weekly Les Nouvelles littéraires from 1975 to 1983 and was director of collections of the Éditions de la Table ronde from 1962 to 1972.

On 9 January 2014, in the wake of the "Dieudonné affair", Tesson called for the actor's execution on the radio program Accords/désaccords, hosted by Guillaume Durand on Radio Classique. His comments were not denounced by Durand or the radio station. He was a guest on Europe 1 six days later while a complaint was filed against him by the Tribunal judiciaire de Paris for an incitement of murder. He doubled down on his remarks, although stating that it was not an "incitement of murder" but instead a "formula of style". On 6 March 2014, LCI and Radio Classique were warned by the Conseil supérieur de l'audiovisuel.

On 13 January 2015, in the wake of the January 2015 Île-de-France attacks, he declared on Europe 1, "Where does the problem of the attack on secularism come from if not Muslims? Do we say that? Well I say it! […] Am I dreaming ? That's our problem right now, it's the Muslims who question secularism! It's not the Muslims who bring shit to France today? It must be said". A complaint was filed against him two days later for incitement of hatred. A preliminary investigation commenced on 19 January 2015. The Conseil supérieur de l'audiovisuel also began an investigation after receiving several complaints on the remarks. MRAP filed a complaint for "defamation and provocation to hatred" and the Coordination contre le racisme et l’islamophobie (CRI) named Tesson in proceedings. On 17 March 2015, a judge of the Tribunal de grande instance de Paris rejected the complaint of the CRI on the grounds that "Mr. Tesson's remarks cannot be understood as a generalization according to which people of the Muslim faith are by nature and as a whole responsible for the evils disorders of French society". The CRI announced its intentions to appeal the decision.

Tesson died in Chatou on 1 February 2023, at the age of 94.

== Decorations ==
- Knight of the Legion of Honour (1987)
- Officer of the Legion of Honour (2009)

== Books ==
- De Gaulle 1er, la révolution manquée (1965)
- La Pensée unique. Le vrai procès, with other authors including Jean Foyer, Jacques Julliard, Jean-François Kahn and Jean-Pierre Thiollet (1998)
- Où est passée l'autorité ? (2000)
- La Campagne de France (2012)

== Bibliography ==
- "Philippe Tesson", in Hallier, tout feu tout flamme, Jean-Pierre Thiollet, Neva Editions, 2023, p.264-274 .ISBN 978-2-35055-309-2
