= Jane Thylda =

Princess of the House of Broglie (1869–1935)

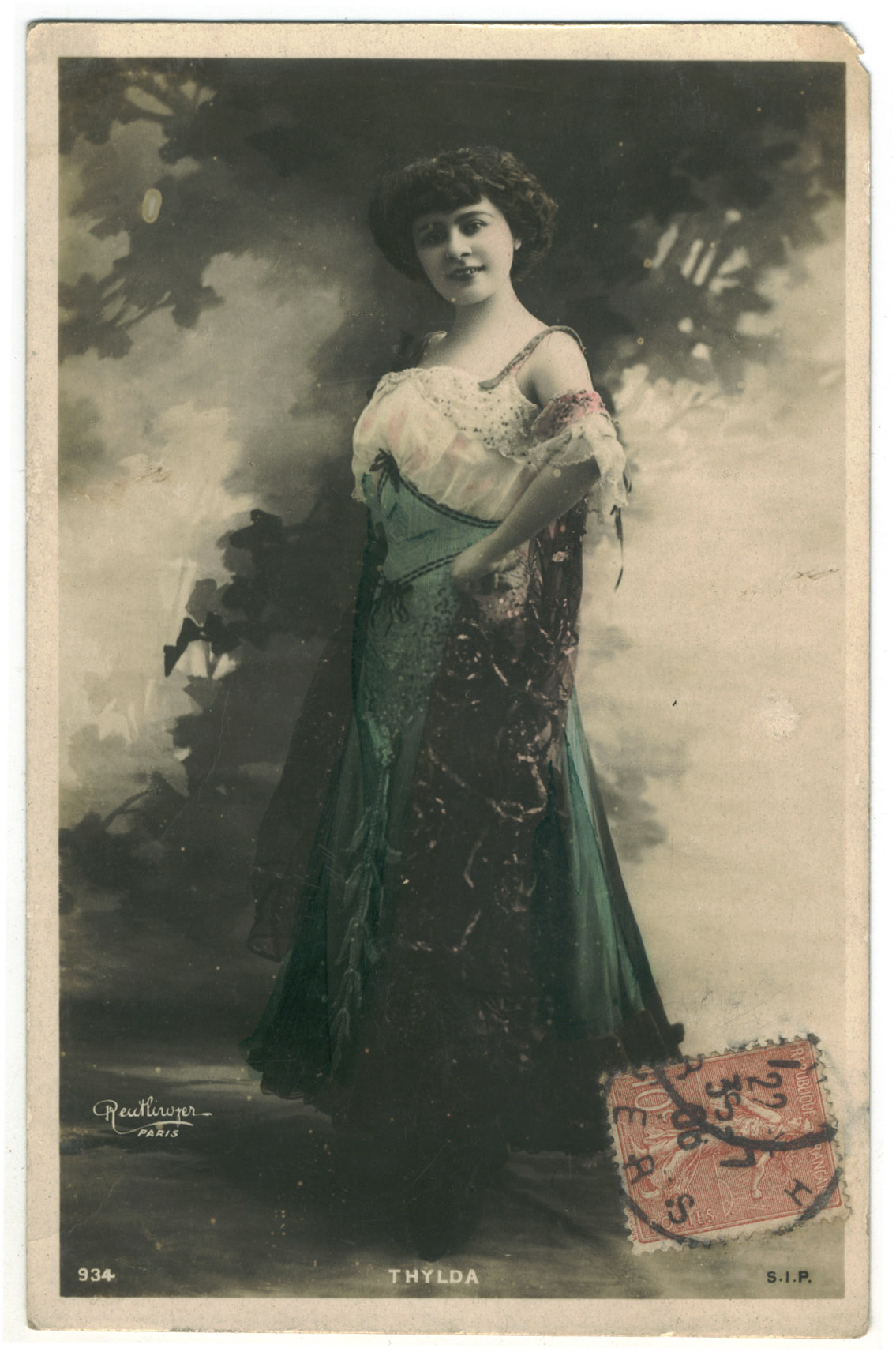
- A portrait of Thylda by Léopold-Émile Reutlinger
- Born: Jeanne Tricaud; 10 April 1869; Lyon, France
- Died: 26 May 1935 (aged 66); Arcachon, France
- Occupations: Actress; mime artist; music hall performer
- Years active: 1890s – 1903
- Spouse: Auguste de Broglie-Revel (m. 1912)

Jane Thylda (1869–1935) was the stage name of Jeanne Tricaud, a French princess, actress, mime artist, and music hall entertainer active in the late 19th and early 20th centuries. Born on April 10, 1869, in Lyon, she later married into the aristocratic House of Broglie on August 7, 1912, in Paris's 7th arrondissement, acquiring the title of princess.

== Early career ==
Thylda's acting career began with comedy roles in Bordeaux, including L'Amant de sa femme by Aurélien Scholl on December 30, 1890, and the part of Clo-Clo in Albin Valabrègue and Pierre Decourcelle's play of the same name in 1892 at the Théâtre des Arts. She played both ingenue and coquette parts in productions like The Master of Forges, Paris Fin de siècle, and others. Thylda then moved to Paris and took over the lead role in Madame Sans-Gêne at the prestigious Théâtre du Vaudeville, previously played by Cécile Sorel.

== Transition to Music Hall ==
In 1898, Thylda abandoned traditional theater for the music hall circuit, being hired at the Olympia where she debuted in the ballet-pantomime Vision by Roger-Milès and Missa, before being engaged at the famous Folies Bergère. The music hall became a new outlet at the very end of the 19th century for "professional beauties" seeking the celebrated status of being an "artist" and the accompanying applause. At the Folies Bergère, Thylda performed in such daring productions as The Princess at the Sabbath (January 1899), The Great Courtesans (May 1899), Prince Desire (November 1899), and Cythera (April 1900). The titles of these shows were unambiguous in their subject matter. Thylda's ballets perfectly embodied both the pornographic fantasy and the illusion of respectability.

== Collaborations and conflicts ==
One of Thylda's high-profile collaborations was co-starring with the celebrated demimondaine Liane de Pougy in the Olympia production of Watteau from October 8 to December 22, 1900, based on the pantomime by Jean Lorrain. However, their shared romantic entanglements and violent clashes, exalted by courtesans of the era, caused the show to prematurely close. They later reconciled to co-star again in 1901's Duel de femmes à l'Olympia.

== International tours ==
In addition to her prolific work in Parisian theaters, Thylda toured internationally as a performer. She visited Egypt and Sudan in 1904, Burma, Bengal and India in 1906, and Japan in 1907.

== Theater ==
- 1890: L'Amant de sa femme, by Aurélien Scholl, in Bordeaux, December 30.
- 1892: Clo-Clo, by Albin Valabrègue and Pierre Decourcelle, at the théâtre des arts in Bordeaux, as Clo-Clo.

=== Ballet d'action ===
- 1898: Vision!, ballet-pantomime by Edmond Missa based on a libretto by Léon Roger-Millès at the Olympia, January.
- 1898: Barbe-bleue, ballet-pantomime by Charles Lecocq, libretto by R. de Saint-Geniès, at the Olympia, as Rosalinde.
- 1899: La Princesse au sabbat, ballet-pantomime by Jean Lorrain, music by Louis Ganne, she created the role of Plango on January 25, 1899, alongside Jane Margyl (Illys) and Odette Valéry, at the Folies-Bergère, then took over the role of Illys.
- 1899: Les Grandes Courtisanes, ballet by Hubert Desvignes, music by Edmond Missa at the Folies-Bergère, May 13.
- 1899: Pour qui s'emballe t-y ? at the Folies-Bergère.
- 1899: Le Prince Désir, ballet by Pierre Guérande, music by Francis Thomé at the Folies-Bergère, November, as La Femme-Vie.
- 1900: Cythère, ballet by Auguste Germain, music by Louis Ganne, at the Folies-Bergère.
- 1900: Watteau, pantomime by Jean Lorrain, music by Edmond Diet at the Olympia, October 8 - December 22.
- 1900: Le Petit Faust, ballet-pantomime by Gardel-Hervé, at the Olympia, as Méphistophélès.
- 1901: Duel de femmes, ballet by Henri Hirschman at the Olympia, February 23.
- 1902: Cendrillon, ballet-pantomime by Alphonse Lemonnier and Gardel-Hervé, at the Olympia, January 11, as le Prince Myosotis.
- 1902: Le Petit Faust, ballet-pantomime by Gardel-Hervé, music by Hervé, choreography by Curti at the Folies-Bergère.
- 1903: La Chula at the Scala.

== Personal life ==
Thylda had an 11-year relationship with Auguste de Broglie-Revel before their marriage on August 7, 1912, in Paris's 7th arrondissement. They resided at the Villa Saint-Yves and Villa Francia in Arcachon from 1905 to 1917, as well as the Château de Loroy estate.

Prior to her marriage, as a celebrated demi-mondaine and former mistress of writer Jean Lorrain, Thylda purchased a private home at 15 rue de la Néva in Paris from her one-time friend and collaborator Liane de Pougy.

== In popular culture ==
- Portrait of Jane Thylda (1905), charcoal and pink pencil on paper by Picasso.
- Thylda Corset, a corset was named after Jane Thylda.

== Gallery ==
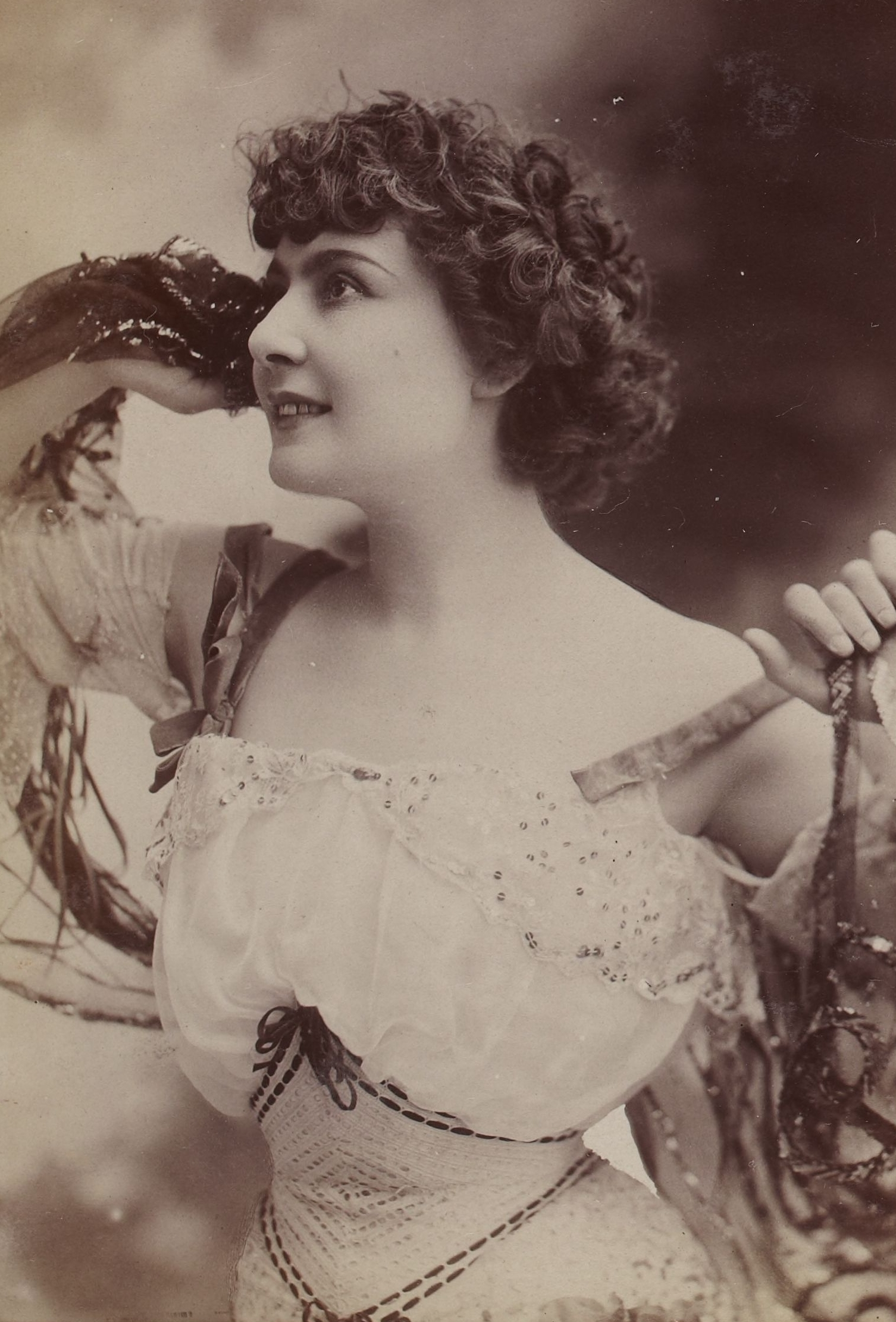

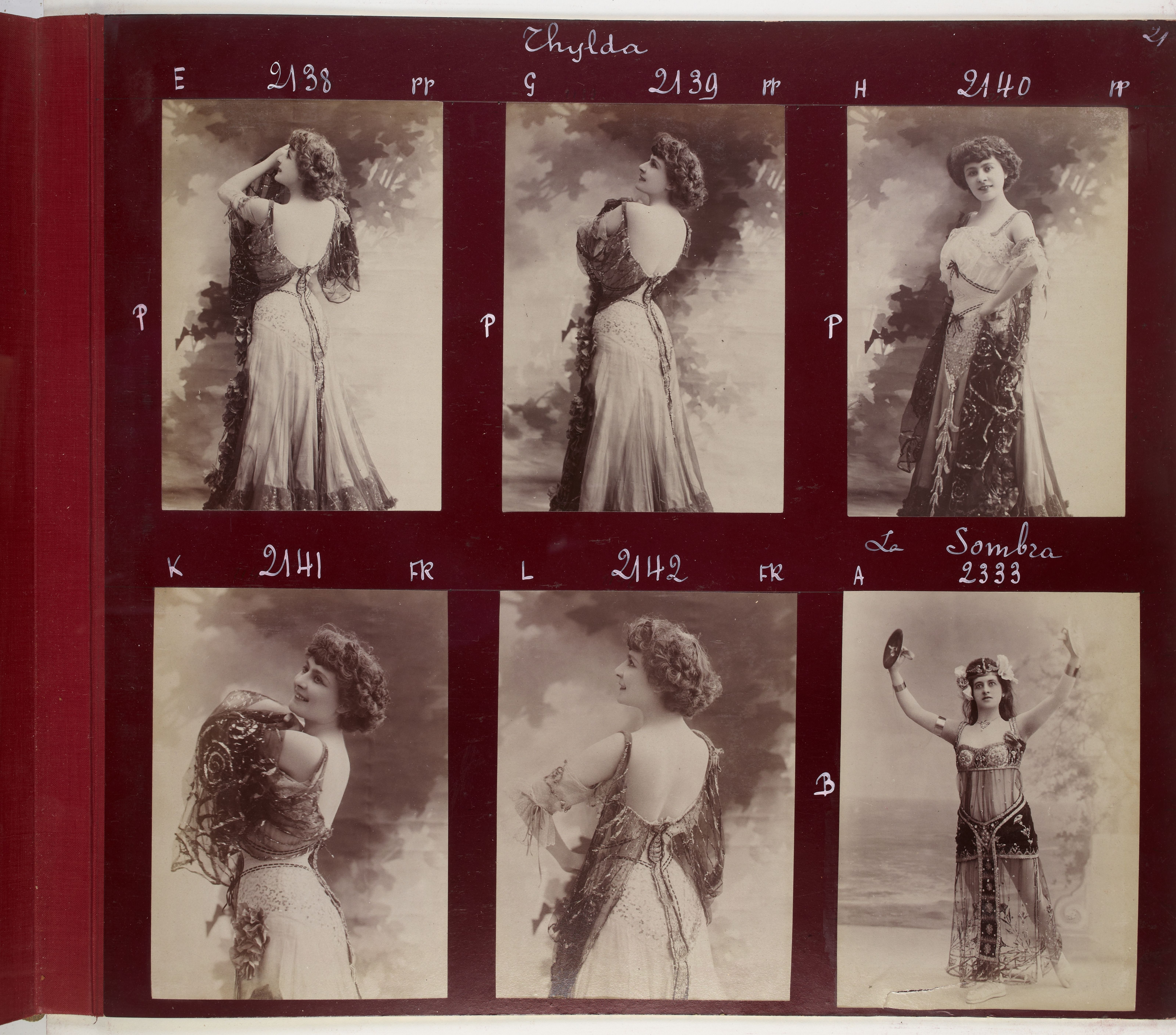

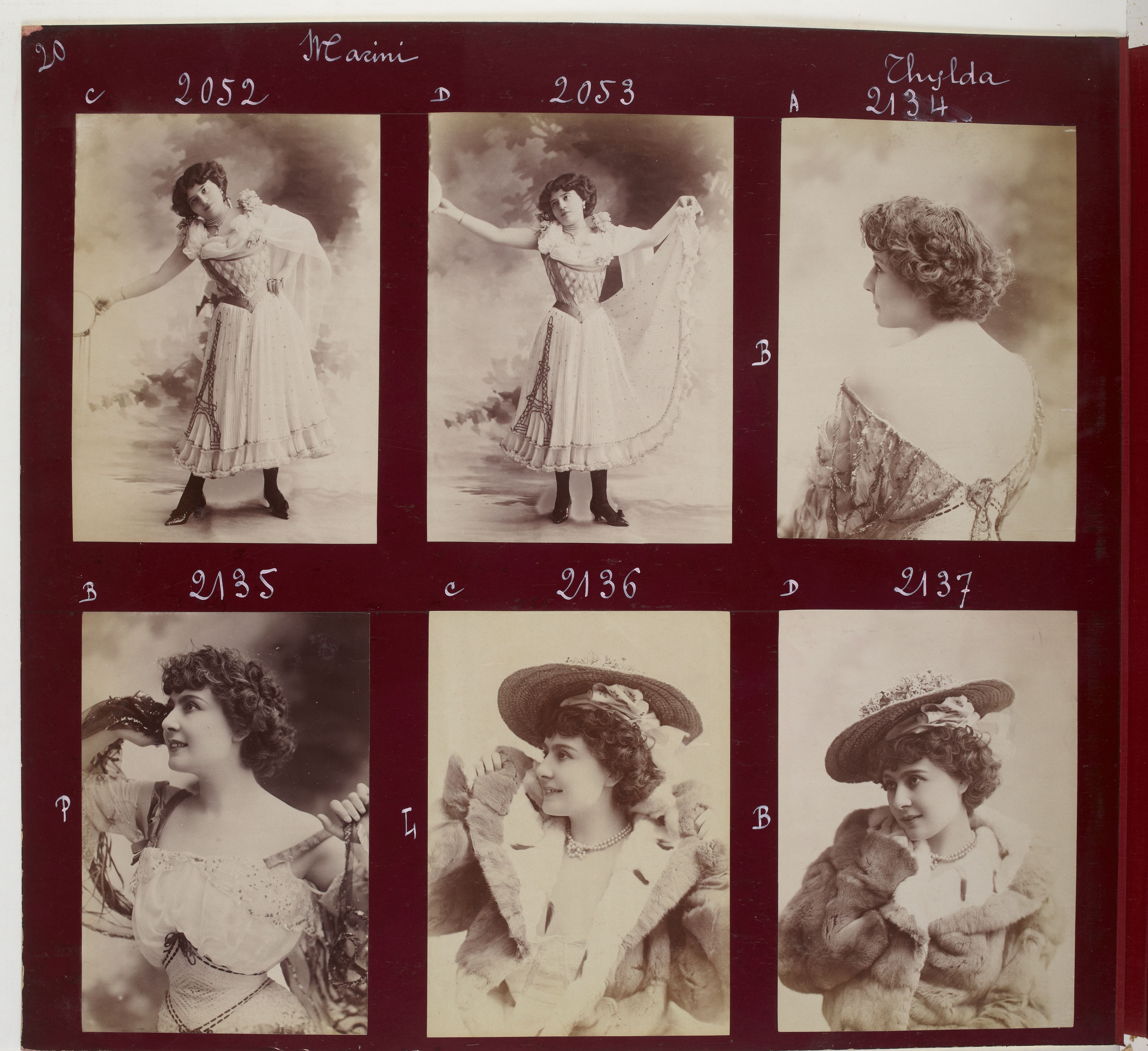

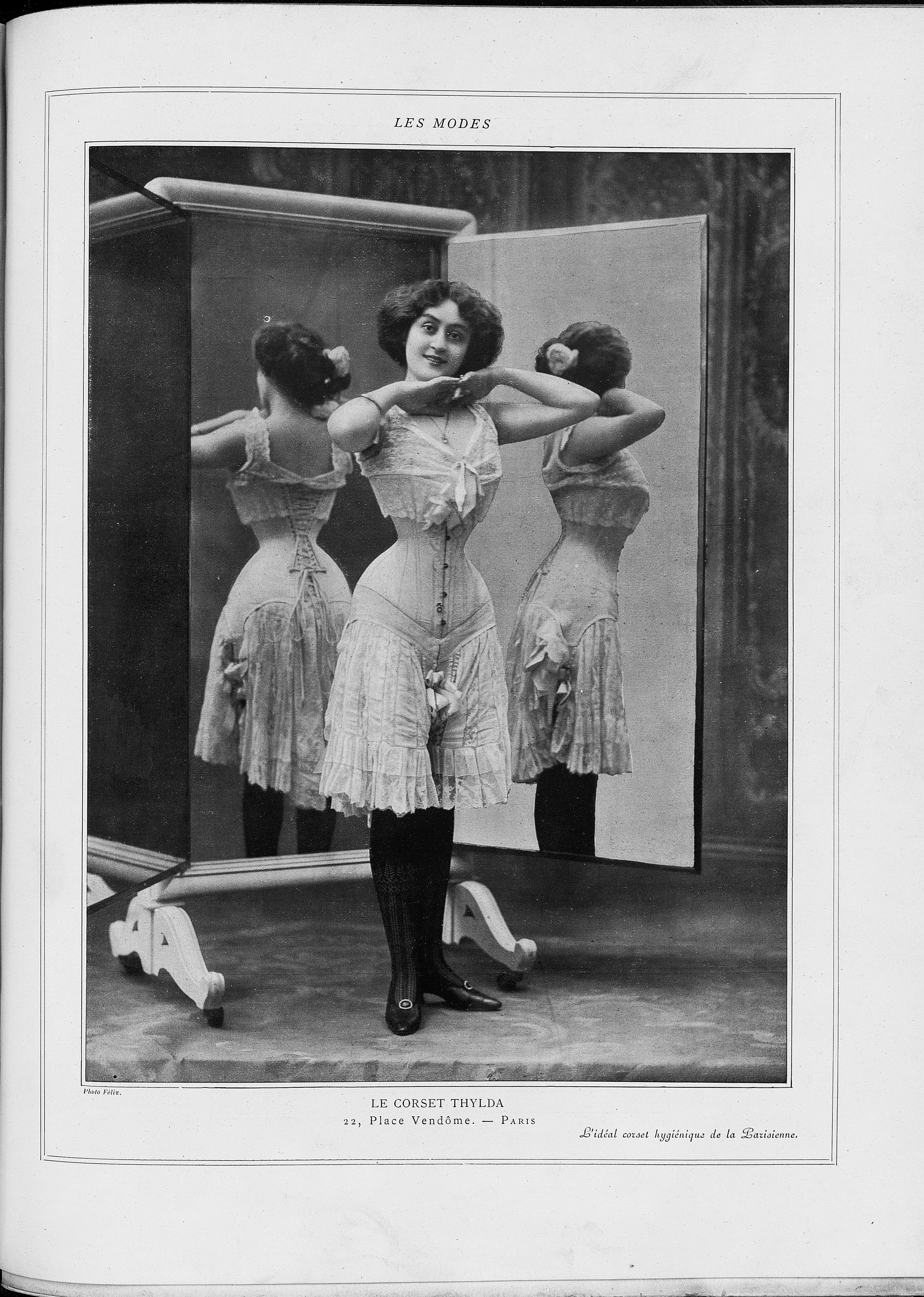
Thylda corset, 1908
