= François-Marie, comte de Broglie =

François-Marie, comte de Broglie and comte de Revel (1 November 1611 – 2 July 1656) was a prominent soldier and commander in the Thirty Years' War.

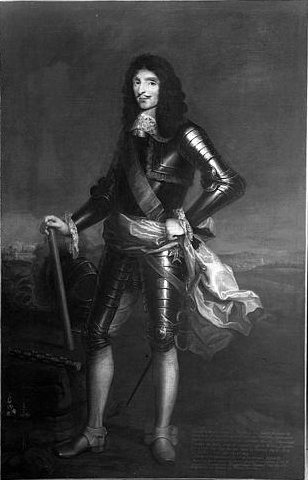
A painting of Henri

Born in Piedmont (then in the Savoyard state), he was originally known as Francesco-Maria di Broglia, conte di Revel before becoming naturalized in France after 1643. Broglie founded one of the enduring families of the French aristocracy. His son Victor-Maurice became a marshal of France, and his grandson, François-Marie (also a marshal of France) became the first duc de Broglie. He died on 2 July 1656 in a siege of Valenza, Italy with the rank of lieutenant-general.
