= Le Quotidien de Paris =

French daily newspaper

Le Quotidien de Paris (French pronunciation: [lə kɔtidjɛ̃ də paʁi]; lit. The Daily of Paris) was a French newspaper founded in 1974 by Philippe Tesson. Along with Le Quotidien du médecin and Le Quotidien du Pharmacien, Le Quotidien de Paris made up the Groupe Quotidien (Daily Press Group) which employed over 550 individuals, with nearly all press organs now defunct. Philippe Tesson intended for it to be the successor to the daily newspaper Combat, of which he had been the editor-in-chief between 1960 and 1964. Combat included articles and editorials from a variety of opinions, as well as an in-depth coverage of cultural events in Paris. The survival of Le Quotidien de Paris during the 1980s and '90s was largely due to the success of another paper from the same publishing group, Le Quotidien du Médecin, which was run by Tesson's wife, Marie-Claude Tesson-Millet. In 1991 it distributed 35,000 newspapers across France. Its last issue appeared in 1996.

== History ==
- 4 April 1974 – Philippe Tesson launched Le Quotidien de Paris.
- 1978 – Publication was temporarily suspended, due to limited distribution and financial resources.
- 27 November 1979 – Reappeared at newsagents, although with a modest distribution, which was viewed as elitist. Had a substantially better financial situation.
- 1981 – After the first election of François Mitterrand as President of the Republic, Le Quotidien de Paris emerged as one of the only opposition newspapers. Consequently, circulations rose to around 70,000 copies.
- 1983 – During a protest movement sparked by over private schooling funded by the state, circulation reached over 100,000 copies.
- June 1993 – During an economic crisis, and a particular bad period for the French press, a refinancing allowed continual publication. This was largely thanks to Banque Verne and GAN.
- 19 October 1994 – La société d'édition du Quotidien was liquidized.
- February 1995 – After the rights to the title of the paper were purchased by a partnership of Nicolas Miguet and Entreprendre Robert Lafont, the paper was rapidly replaced with a new, cheaper version, following the lead of other French papers.
- 14 November 1996 – The publication of the last copy of Le Quotidien de Paris under that title.

== Editorial stance ==
Le Quotidien de Paris adopted a polemical, but diverse, stance from its inception. It included a number of right-leaning journalists, along with many old journalists from Combat and L'Aurore, which were more left-leaning. Shortly after the election of François Mitterrand, when Tesson adopted his stance with the opposition, several journalists left for Le Matin de Paris and L'Événement du Jeudi, citing the shift in editorial stance as going against their conscience. From this point on, the paper leaned strongly to the right.

After being purchased by Nicolas Miguet, the paper leaned increasingly towards the extreme right, as exemplified by the ideas of Bruno Mégret, at the time the second in command of the Front national of Jean-Marie Le Pen. None of the journalists still working for the paper remained on the team after this purchase and transition.

== Journalists ==
Le Quotidien de Paris had many journalists, among them Henry Chapier, Claire Chazal, Laurence Cossé, Pierre Daix, Jean-Pierre Thiollet, Éric Yung and Éric Zemmour.
