= Gabriel de Broglie =

French historian and politician (1931–2025)

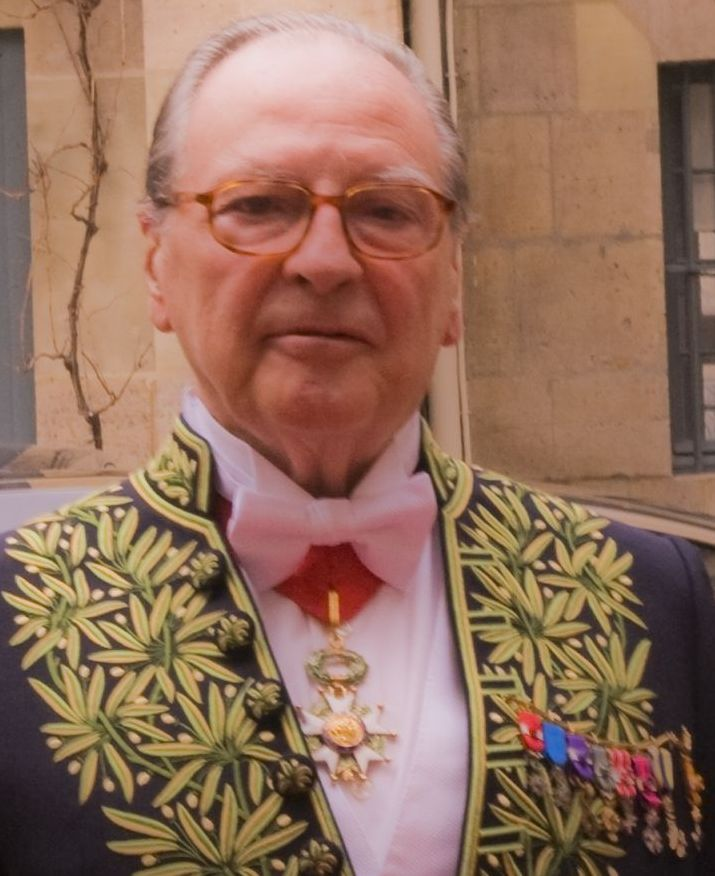
- De Broglie in 2010

Chancellor of the Institut de France
- In office 2006–2017
- Preceded by: Pierre Messmer
- Succeeded by: Xavier Darcos

Personal details
- Born: Gabriel Joseph Marie de Broglie; 21 April 1931 Versailles, France
- Died: 8 January 2025 (aged 93) Paris, France
- Education: École Saint-Martin-de-France
- Alma mater: Sciences Po, ÉNA
- Profession: Historian

Gabriel-Marie-Joseph-Anselme de Broglie-Revel (21 April 1931 – 8 January 2025) was a French historian and politician.

Broglie-Revel was elected to the Académie Française in 2001, replacing Alain Peyrefitte. A distant relative of the ducs de Broglie, he was created a Grand Officer of the Legion of Honour.

De Broglie died in Paris on 8 January 2025, at the age of 93.

== Bibliography ==
- 1972 Le Général de Valence, ou L'Insouciance et la gloire (Perrin)
- 1974 Le Conseil d'État. Ouvrage collectif (Éd. du C.N.R.S.)
- 1977 Ségur sans cérémonie, ou La gaîté libertine (Perrin)
- 1979 Histoire politique de la Revue des deux mondes de 1829 à 1979 (Perrin)
- 1981 L'Orléanisme ou La ressource libérale de la France (Perrin)
- 1982 Une image vaut dix mille mots. Essai sur la télévision (Plon)
- 1985 Madame de Genlis (Perrin)
- 1987 Le Français pour qu'il vive (Gallimard)
- 1990 Guizot (Perrin)
- 1991 La Vraie Madame Gervaisais. Introduction et présentation (Société des Bibliophiles françois)
- 1995 XIXe siècle, l'éclat et le déclin de la France (Perrin)
- 2000 Mac-Mahon (Perrin)
- 2001 Le Droit d'auteur et l'Internet (PUF)
