= Maurice de Broglie, 6th Duke of Broglie =

French physicist (1875–1960)

Maurice de Broglie
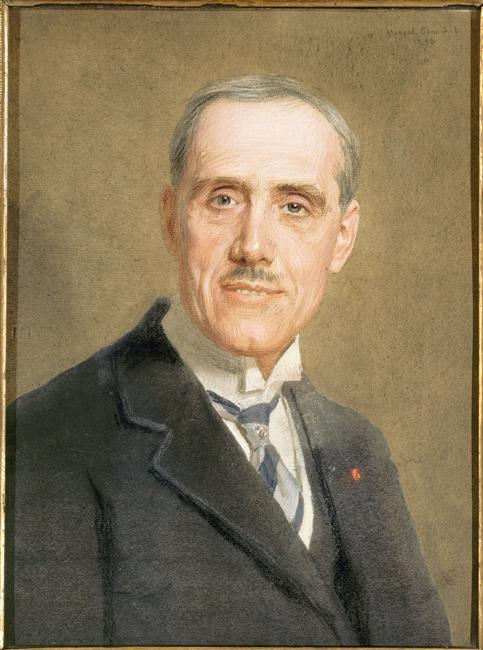
- De Broglie in 1932
- Born: Louis César Victor Maurice de Broglie; 27 April 1875; Paris, France
- Died: 14 July 1960 (aged 85); Neuilly-sur-Seine, France
- Awards: Hughes Medal (1928)
- Scientific career
- Fields: Physics; X-ray diffraction Spectroscopy

Maurice de Broglie, 6th Duke of Broglie (French: [mɔʁis də bʁɔj]; 27 April 1875 – 14 July 1960) was a French physicist. His younger brother was the theoretical physicist Louis de Broglie.

== Biography ==
=== Early years ===
De Broglie was born in Paris, to Victor de Broglie and Pauline de La Forest d'Armaillé (1851–1928). Pauline's parents were Louis de La Forest d'Armaillé, Comte d'Armaillé and Marie Célestine Amélie d'Armaillé, the writer.

In 1901, he was married to Camille Bernou de Rochetaillée (1888–1966) in Paris. They had one daughter, Laure, born on 17 November 1904, who died, aged six, on 12 June 1911. He acceded to the title of duc de Broglie on his father's death in 1906. He died on 14 July 1960 in Neuilly-sur-Seine. His only child having died almost a half-century before, his brother Louis succeeded him as duke.

Having graduated from naval officer's school, Maurice de Broglie spent nine years in the French Navy, serving on a gunboat at Bizerte and in the Mediterranean Squadron. While serving, he became interested in physics, and began doing research on electromagnetism. De Broglie defied his family's wishes and left the navy in 1904 to pursue a scientific career. He studied under Paul Langevin at the Collège de France in Paris, receiving his doctorate in 1908.

=== Career ===
De Broglie made advances in the study of X-ray diffraction and spectroscopy. During the First World War, he worked on radio communications for the navy. After the war, he resumed his research at a large laboratory in his home. He occasionally collaborated with his younger brother Louis, who followed his professional lead and was training as a physicist, and they coauthored a paper in 1921. After Louis de Broglie's rise to prominence in the 1920s, building on some of their shared research, the elder de Broglie physicist continued his own research. While Louis was primarily a theoretician, Maurice's focus was mainly experimental.

De Broglie became a member of the Académie des sciences in 1924, and in 1934 was elected to the Académie française, replacing the historian Pierre de La Gorce. He had the unique honor of welcoming his own brother into the academy on the latter's induction. In 1942 he succeeded his mentor, assuming Langevin's chair in physics at the Collège de France. He was also elected to the Royal Society of London on 23 May 1940, having received the Royal Society's Hughes Medal in 1928.

== Bibliography ==
- "Les Immortels: Maurice de BROGLIE" (in French). Académie française. 2009.

French nobility
Preceded by Victor de Broglie	Duke of Broglie; 1906–1960	Succeeded by Louis de Broglie
