= Louis de Broglie =

French physicist (1892–1987)

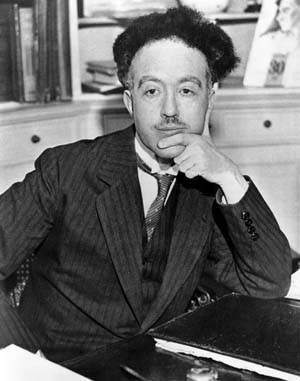
- De Broglie in 1929
- Born: Louis Victor Pierre Raymond; 15 August 1892; Dieppe, France
- Died: 19 March 1987 (aged 94); Louveciennes, France
- Education: University of Paris (BA, BSc, PhD)
- Known for: De Broglie hypothesis; De Broglie–Bohm theory
- Father: Victor de Broglie
- Relatives: Maurice de Broglie (brother)
- Family: Broglie
- Awards: Nobel Prize in Physics (1929); Max Planck Medal (1938); Kalinga Prize (1952)
- Scientific career
- Fields: Physics
- Workplaces: University of Paris
- Thesis: Recherches sur la théorie des quanta (1924)
- Doctoral advisor: Paul Langevin
- Doctoral students: Nicolás Cabrera; Olivier Costa de Beauregard; Bernard d'Espagnat; Cécile DeWitt-Morette; Alexandru Proca; Marie-Antoinette Tonnelat; Satosi Watanabe

Louis Victor Pierre Raymond, 7th Duc de Broglie (Note: /də ˈbroʊɡli/, also US: /də broʊˈɡliː, də ˈbrɔɪ/; French: [də bʁɔj]) (15 August 1892 – 19 March 1987) was a French theoretical physicist and aristocrat known for his contributions to quantum theory. In his 1924 Ph.D. thesis, he postulated the wave nature of electrons and suggested that all matter has wave properties. This concept is known as the de Broglie hypothesis, an example of wave–particle duality, and forms a central part of the theory of quantum mechanics. In 1929, de Broglie won the Nobel Prize in Physics, after the wave-like behaviour of matter was experimentally confirmed in 1927. This confirmation earned George Paget Thomson and Clinton Davisson the Nobel Prize in Physics in 1937.

The wave-like behaviour of particles theorized by de Broglie was used by Erwin Schrödinger in his formulation of wave mechanics. De Broglie presented an alternative interpretation of these mechanics called the pilot-wave concept at the 1927 Solvay Conferences, but then abandoned it. In 1952, David Bohm developed a new form of the concept which became known as the de Broglie–Bohm theory. De Broglie revisited the idea in 1956, creating another version that incorporated ideas from Bohm and Jean-Pierre Vigier.

Louis de Broglie was the sixteenth member elected to occupy seat 1 of the Académie Française in 1944, and served as Perpetual Secretary of the French Academy of Sciences. De Broglie became the first high-level scientist to call for establishment of a multi-national laboratory, a proposal that led to the establishment of the European Organization for Nuclear Research (CERN). Among his publications were The Revolution in Physics and Matter and Light. He was honorary president of the French Association of Science Writers and received the inaugural Kalinga Prize from UNESCO for his efforts to popularize science.

== Biography ==
=== Family and education ===
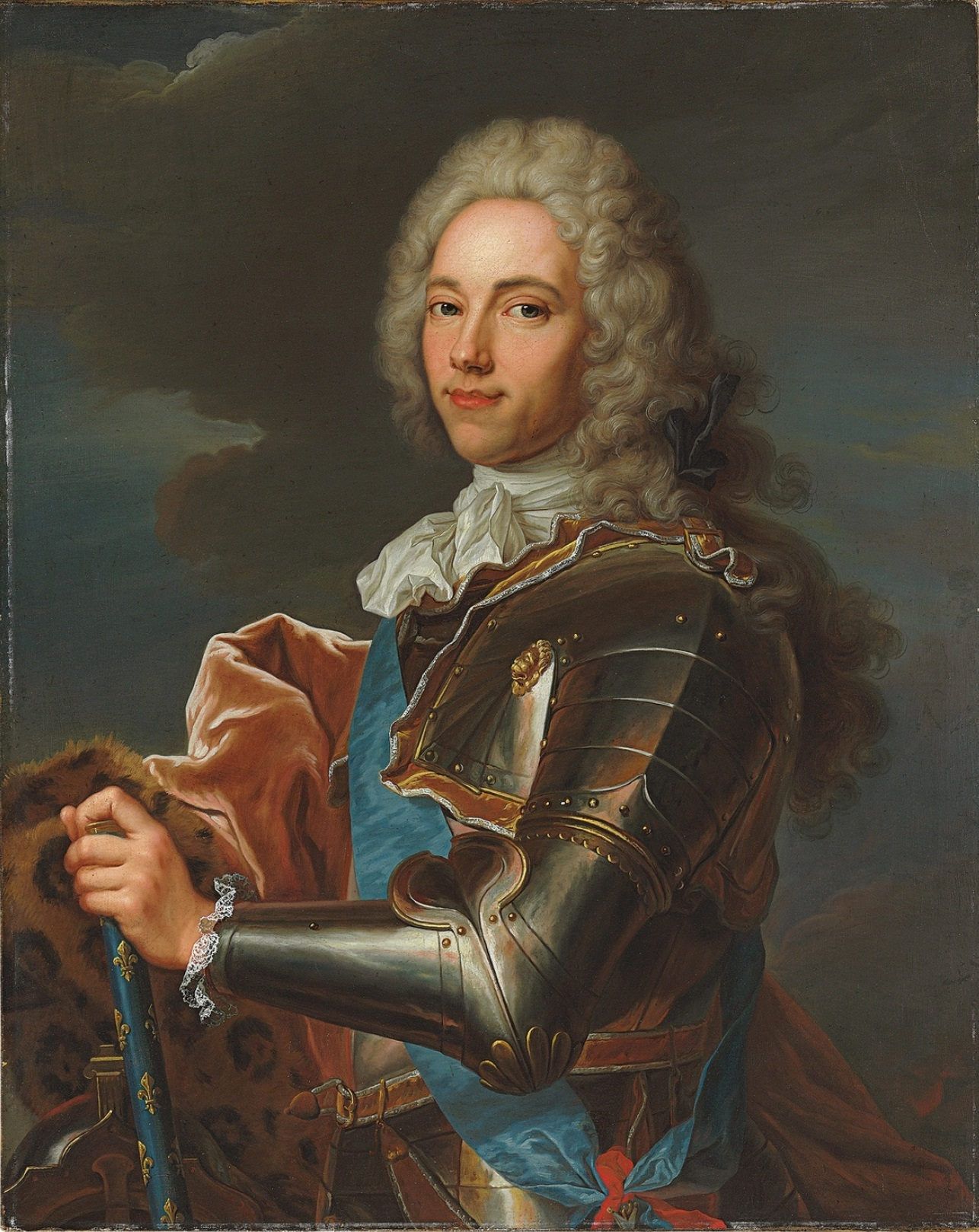
François-Marie, 1st duc de Broglie (1671–1745), ancestor of Louis de Broglie and Marshal of France under Louis XV

Louis Victor Pierre Raymond was born on 15 August 1892 in Dieppe, France, into the aristocratic House of Broglie, a noble family of Italian origin, whose representatives for several centuries occupied important military and political posts in France. His father, Louis-Alphonse-Victor, 5th duc de Broglie, was married to Pauline d'Armaille, the granddaughter of the Napoleonic General Philippe Paul, comte de Ségur, and his wife, the biographer Marie Célestine Amélie d'Armaillé. They had five children; in addition to Louis, these were: Albertina (1872–1946), subsequently the Marquise de Luppé; Maurice (1875–1960), subsequently a famous experimental physicist; Philip (1881–1890), who died two years before the birth of Louis, and Pauline, Comtesse de Pange (1888–1972), subsequently a famous writer. Per The New York Times, "a great-grandfather fought on George Washington's side in the American Revolutionary War as the chief lieutenant of the Marquis de Lafayette."

De Broglie was said to have been a good looking and charming child with an aptitude for history. Though sometimes lonely, he had a strong memory and interest in politics. He attended Lycée Janson-de-Sailly, and passed the baccalauréat in 1909. At university, he first studied literature, and received a licence ès lettres in History in 1910. Afterwards, he turned his attention towards science, receiving a licence ès sciences in 1913. With the outbreak of the First World War in 1914, he offered his services to the Wireless section of the army in the development of radio communications.

=== Military service ===
After graduation, de Broglie joined the engineering forces to undergo compulsory service. It began at Fort Mont Valérien, but soon, on the initiative of his brother, he was seconded to the Wireless Communications Service and worked on the Eiffel Tower, where the radio transmitter was located. Louis de Broglie remained in military service throughout the First World War, dealing with purely technical issues. In particular, together with Léon Brillouin and brother Maurice, he participated in establishing wireless communications with submarines. Louis de Broglie was demobilized in August 1919 with the rank of adjudant. Later, the scientist regretted that he had to spend about six years away from the fundamental problems of science that interested him.

=== Scientific and pedagogical career ===
His 1924 thesis Recherches sur la théorie des quanta (Research on the Theory of the Quanta) introduced his theory of electron waves. This included the wave–particle duality theory of matter, based on the work of Max Planck and Albert Einstein on light. This research culminated in the de Broglie hypothesis stating that any moving particle or object had an associated wave. De Broglie thus created a new field in physics, the mécanique ondulatoire, or wave mechanics, uniting the physics of energy (wave) and matter (particle). He won the Nobel Prize in Physics in 1929 "for his discovery of the wave nature of electrons".

In his later career, de Broglie worked to develop a causal explanation of wave mechanics, in opposition to the wholly probabilistic models which dominate quantum mechanical theory; it was refined by David Bohm in the 1950s. The theory has since been known as the De Broglie–Bohm theory.

In addition to strictly scientific work, de Broglie thought and wrote about the philosophy of science, including the value of modern scientific discoveries. In 1930 he founded the book series Actualités scientifiques et industrielles published by Éditions Hermann.

De Broglie became a member of the Académie des sciences in 1933, and was the academy's perpetual secretary from 1942. He was asked to join Le Conseil de l'Union Catholique des Scientifiques Francais, but declined because he was non-religious. In 1941, he was made a member of the National Council of Vichy France. On 12 October 1944, he was elected to the Académie Française, replacing mathematician Émile Picard. Because of the deaths and imprisonments of Académie members during the occupation and other effects of the war, the Académie was unable to meet the quorum of twenty members for his election; due to the exceptional circumstances, however, his unanimous election by the seventeen members present was accepted. In an event unique in the history of the Académie, he was received as a member by his own brother Maurice, who had been elected in 1934. UNESCO awarded him the first Kalinga Prize in 1952 for his work in popularizing scientific knowledge, and he was elected a Foreign Member of the Royal Society on 23 April 1953.

Louis became the 7th duc de Broglie in 1960 upon the death without heir of his elder brother, Maurice, 6th duc de Broglie, also a physicist.

In 1961, de Broglie received the title of Knight of the Grand Cross in the Legion of Honour. De Broglie was awarded a post as counselor to the French High Commission of Atomic Energy in 1945 for his efforts to bring industry and science closer together. He established a center for applied mechanics at the Henri Poincaré Institute, where research into optics, cybernetics, and atomic energy were carried out. He inspired the formation of the International Academy of Quantum Molecular Science and was an early member.

De Broglie never married. When he died on 19 March 1987 in Louveciennes at the age of 94, he was succeeded as duke by a distant cousin, Victor-François, 8th duc de Broglie. His funeral was held 23 March 1987 at the Church of Saint-Pierre-de-Neuilly. Jean-Claude Lehmann, director of the physics department at France's National Center for Scientific Research, said: "The death of Louis de Broglie marks the disappearance of one of the most brilliant pioneers in contemporary physics."

== Research ==
=== Physics of X-ray and photoelectric effect ===
The first works of Louis de Broglie (early 1920s) were performed in the laboratory of his older brother Maurice and dealt with the features of the photoelectric effect and the properties of x-rays. These publications examined the absorption of X-rays and described this phenomenon using the Bohr theory, applied quantum principles to the interpretation of photoelectron spectra, and gave a systematic classification of X-ray spectra. The studies of X-ray spectra were important for elucidating the structure of the internal electron shells of atoms (optical spectra are determined by the outer shells). Thus, the results of experiments conducted together with Alexandre Dauvillier, revealed the shortcomings of the existing schemes for the distribution of electrons in atoms; these difficulties were eliminated by Edmund Stoner. Another result was the elucidation of the insufficiency of the Sommerfeld formula for determining the position of lines in X-ray spectra; this discrepancy was eliminated after the discovery of the electron spin. In 1925 and 1926, Leningrad physicist Orest Khvolson nominated the de Broglie brothers for the Nobel Prize for their work in the field of X-rays.

=== Matter and wave–particle duality ===
Studying the nature of X-ray radiation and discussing its properties with his brother Maurice, who considered these rays to be some kind of combination of waves and particles, contributed to Louis de Broglie's awareness of the need to build a theory linking particle and wave representations. In addition, he was familiar with the works (1919–1922) of Marcel Brillouin, which proposed a hydrodynamic model of an atom and attempted to relate it to the results of Bohr's theory. The starting point in the work of Louis de Broglie was the idea of Einstein about the quanta of light. In his first article on this subject, published in 1922, the French scientist considered blackbody radiation as a gas of light quanta and, using classical statistical mechanics, derived the Wien radiation law in the framework of such a representation. In his next publication, he tried to reconcile the concept of light quanta with the phenomena of interference and diffraction and came to the conclusion that it was necessary to associate a certain periodicity with quanta. In this case, light quanta were interpreted by him as relativistic particles of very small mass.

It remained to extend the wave considerations to any massive particles, and in the summer of 1923 a decisive breakthrough occurred. De Broglie outlined his ideas in a short note "Waves and quanta" (French: Ondes et quanta, presented at a meeting of the Paris Academy of Sciences on 10 September 1923), which marked the beginning of the creation of wave mechanics. In this paper and his subsequent PhD thesis, the scientist suggested that a moving particle with energy E and velocity v is characterized by some internal periodic process with a frequency $E/h$ (later known as Compton frequency), where $h$ is the Planck constant. To reconcile these considerations, based on the quantum principle, with the ideas of special relativity, de Broglie associated wave he called a "phase wave" with a moving body, which propagates with the phase velocity $c^2/v$. Such a wave, which later received the name matter wave, or de Broglie wave, in the process of body movement remains in phase with the internal periodic process. Having then examined the motion of an electron in a closed orbit, the scientist showed that the requirement for phase matching directly leads to the quantum Bohr-Sommerfeld condition, that is, to quantize the angular momentum. In the next two notes (reported at the meetings on 24 September and 8 October, respectively), de Broglie came to the conclusion that the particle velocity is equal to the group velocity of phase waves, and the particle moves along the normal to surfaces of equal phase. In the general case, the trajectory of a particle can be determined using Fermat's principle (for waves) or the principle of least action (for particles), which indicates a connection between geometric optics and classical mechanics. The de Broglie wavelength λ is the Planck constant h divided by momentum p:
$$\lambda = \frac{h}{p}.$$

This theory set the basis of wave mechanics. It was supported by Albert Einstein, confirmed by the electron diffraction experiments of George Paget Thomson in the United Kingdom and Clinton Davisson and Lester Germer in the United States, and generalized by the work of Erwin Schrödinger.

Originally, de Broglie thought that a real wave (i.e., having a direct physical interpretation) was associated with particles. However, when the wave aspect of matter was formalized by a wavefunction defined by the Schrödinger equation, it came out as a pure mathematical entity having a probabilistic interpretation, without the support of physical elements. This wavefunction gives wave behavior to matter but it is only observed through individual quantum samples. However, in 1956 de Broglie again attempted a theory of a direct and physical interpretation of matter-waves, following the work of David Bohm and suggestions of Jean-Pierre Vigier.

=== Conjecture of an internal clock of the electron ===
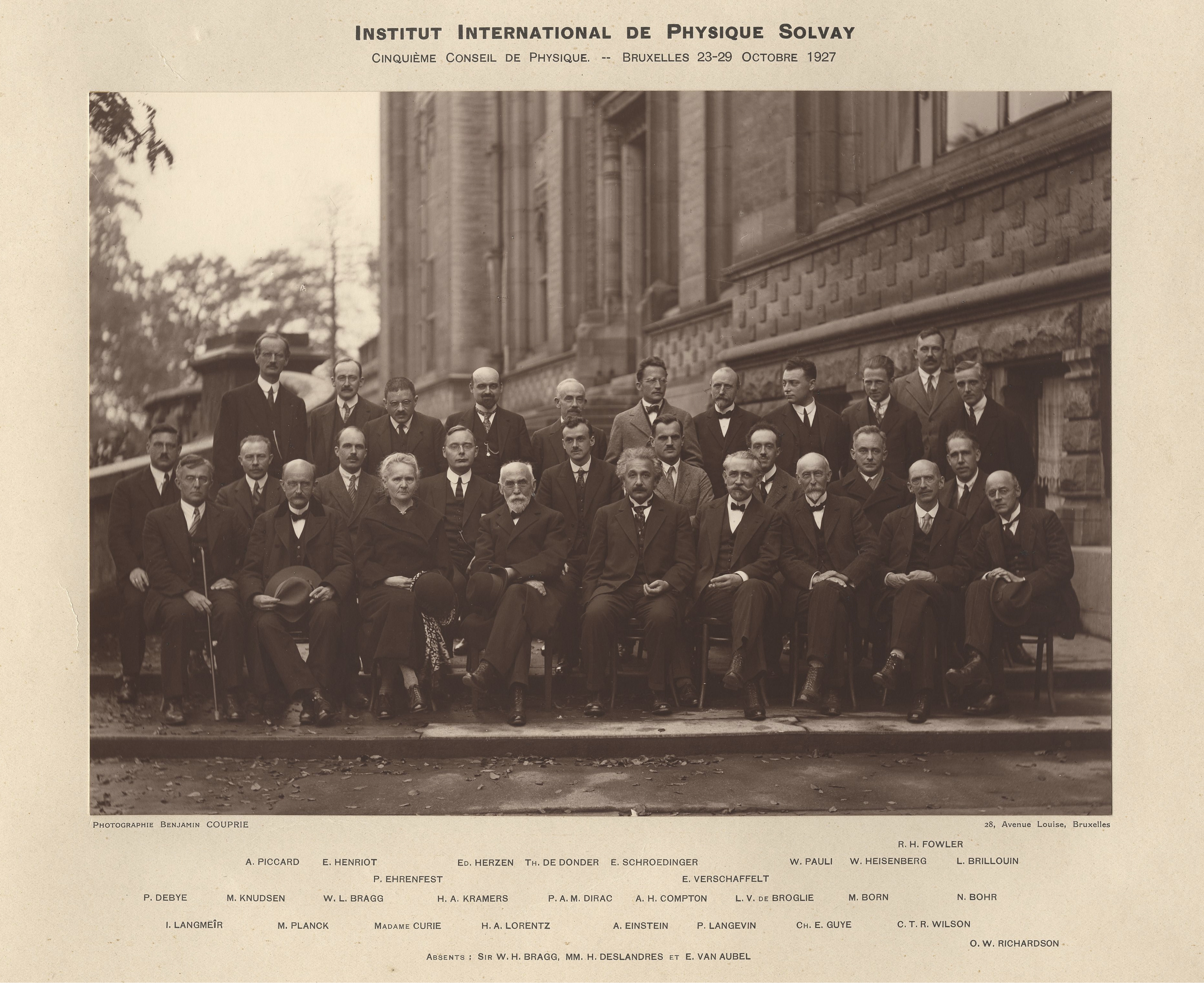
De Broglie presented at the Solvay conference 1927 (third from right in middle row).

In his 1924 thesis, de Broglie conjectured that the electron has an internal clock that constitutes part of the mechanism by which a pilot wave guides a particle. Subsequently, David Hestenes has proposed a link to the zitterbewegung that was suggested by Schrödinger.

While attempts at verifying the internal clock hypothesis and measuring clock frequency are so far not conclusive, recent experimental data is at least compatible with de Broglie's conjecture.

=== Non-nullity and variability of mass ===
According to de Broglie, the neutrino and the photon have rest masses that are non-zero, though very low. That a photon is not quite massless is imposed by the coherence of his theory. Incidentally, this rejection of the hypothesis of a massless photon enabled him to doubt the hypothesis of the expansion of the universe.

In addition, he believed that the true mass of particles is not constant, but variable, and that each particle can be represented as a thermodynamic machine equivalent to a cyclic integral of action.

=== Generalization of the principle of least action ===
In the second part of his 1924 thesis, de Broglie used the equivalence of the mechanical principle of least action with Fermat's optical principle: "Fermat's principle applied to phase waves is identical to Maupertuis' principle applied to the moving body; the possible dynamic trajectories of the moving body are identical to the possible rays of the wave." This latter equivalence had been pointed out by William Rowan Hamilton a century earlier, and published by him around 1830, for the case of light.

=== Duality of the laws of nature ===
Far from claiming to make "the contradiction disappear" which Max Born thought could be achieved with a statistical approach, de Broglie extended wave–particle duality to all particles (and to crystals which revealed the effects of diffraction) and extended the principle of duality to the laws of nature.

His last work made a single system of laws from the two large systems of thermodynamics and of mechanics:

When Boltzmann and his continuators developed their statistical interpretation of Thermodynamics, one could have considered Thermodynamics to be a complicated branch of Dynamics. But, with my actual ideas, it's Dynamics that appear to be a simplified branch of Thermodynamics. I think that, of all the ideas that I've introduced in quantum theory in these past years, it's that idea that is, by far, the most important and the most profound.

That idea seems to match the continuous–discontinuous duality, since its dynamics could be the limit of its thermodynamics when transitions to continuous limits are postulated. It is also close to that of Gottfried Wilhelm Leibniz, who posited the necessity of "architectonic principles" to complete the system of mechanical laws.

However, according to him, there is less duality, in the sense of opposition, than synthesis (one is the limit of the other) and the effort of synthesis is constant according to him, like in his first formula, in which the first member pertains to mechanics and the second to optics:

$$m c^2 = h \nu$$

=== Neutrino theory of light ===
The neutrino theory of light, which dates from 1934, introduces the idea that the photon is equivalent to the fusion of two Dirac neutrinos. In 1938, the concept was challenged as not rotationally invariant and work on the concept was largely discontinued.

=== Hidden thermodynamics ===
De Broglie's final idea was the hidden thermodynamics of isolated particles. It is an attempt to bring together the three furthest principles of physics: the principles of Fermat, Maupertuis, and Carnot.

In this work, action becomes a sort of opposite to entropy, through an equation that relates the only two universal dimensions of the form:

$${\text{action}\over h} = -{\text{entropy}\over k}$$

As a consequence of its great impact, this theory brings back the uncertainty principle to distances around extrema of action, distances corresponding to reductions in entropy.

== Recognition ==
=== Awards ===
Year	Organization	Award	Citation	Ref.
1929	Royal Swedish Academy of Sciences	Nobel Prize in Physics	"For his discovery of the wave nature of electrons."	
1938	German Physical Society	Max Planck Medal	—	
1952	UNESCO	Kalinga Prize	"In recognition of his work for the popularization of science, notably through his many scientific articles and publications."	

=== Memberships ===
Year	Organization	Type	Ref.
1933	French Academy of Sciences	Member	
1939	American Philosophical Society	International Member	
1948	National Academy of Sciences	International Member	
1953	Royal Society	Foreign Member	
1958	American Academy of Arts and Sciences	International Honorary Member	

== Publications ==
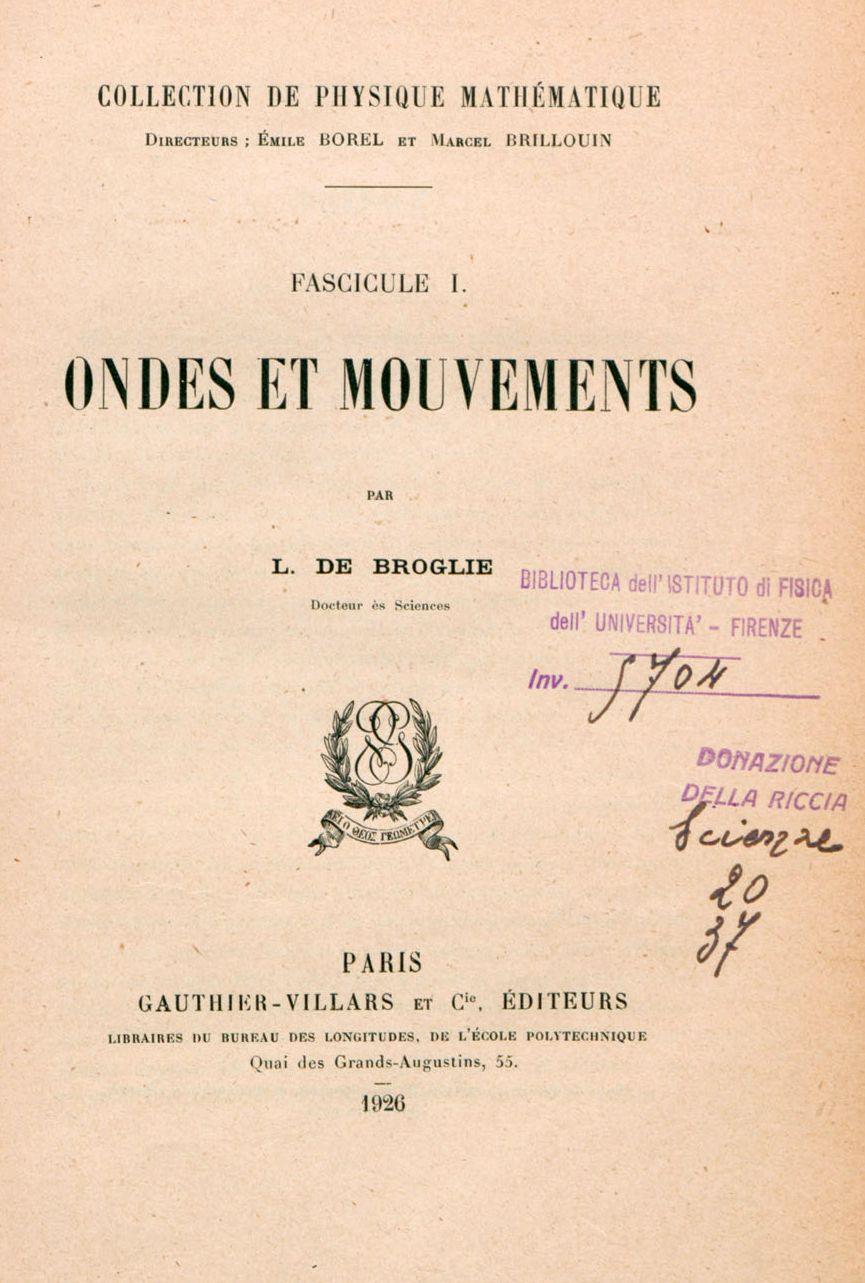
Ondes et mouvements, 1926

- Recherches sur la théorie des quanta (Researches on the quantum theory), Thesis, Paris, 1924, Ann. de Physique (10) 3, 22 (1925).
- Introduction à la physique des rayons X et gamma (Introduction to physics of X-rays and Gamma-rays), with Maurice de Broglie, Gauthier-Villars, 1928.
- Ondes et mouvements (in French). Paris: Gauthier-Villars. 1926.
- Rapport au 5ème Conseil de Physique Solvay (Report for the 5th Solvay Physics Congress), Brussels, 1927.
- Mecanique ondulatoire (in French). Paris: Gauthier-Villars. 1928.
- Recueil d'exposés sur les ondes et corpuscules (in French). Paris: Librairie scientifique Hermann et C.ie. 1930.
- Matière et lumière (Matter and Light), Paris: Albin Michel, 1937.
- La Physique nouvelle et les quanta (New Physics and Quanta), Flammarion, 1937.
- Continu et discontinu en physique moderne (Continuous and discontinuous in Modern Physics), Paris: Albin Michel, 1941.
- Ondes, corpuscules, mécanique ondulatoire (Waves, Corpuscles, Wave Mechanics), Paris: Albin Michel, 1945.
- Physique et microphysique (Physics and Microphysics), Albin Michel, 1947.
- Vie et œuvre de Paul Langevin (The life and works of Paul Langevin), French Academy of Sciences, 1947.
- Optique électronique et corpusculaire (Electronic and Corpuscular Optics), Herman, 1950.
- Savants et découvertes (Scientists and discoveries), Paris, Albin Michel, 1951.
- Une tentative d'interprétation causale et non linéaire de la mécanique ondulatoire: la théorie de la double solution. Paris: Gauthier-Villars, 1956.
  - English translation: Non-linear Wave Mechanics: A Causal Interpretation. Amsterdam: Elsevier, 1960.
- Nouvelles perspectives en microphysique (New prospects in Microphysics), Albin Michel, 1956.
- Sur les sentiers de la science (On the Paths of Science), Paris: Albin Michel, 1960.
- Introduction à la nouvelle théorie des particules de M. Jean-Pierre Vigier et de ses collaborateurs, Paris: Gauthier-Villars, 1961. Paris: Albin Michel, 1960.
  - English translation: Introduction to the Vigier Theory of elementary particles, Amsterdam: Elsevier, 1963.
- Étude critique des bases de l'interprétation actuelle de la mécanique ondulatoire, Paris: Gauthier-Villars, 1963.
  - English translation: The Current Interpretation of Wave Mechanics: A Critical Study, Amsterdam, Elsevier, 1964.
- Certitudes et incertitudes de la science (Certitudes and Incertitudes of Science). Paris: Albin Michel, 1966.
- with Louis Armand, Pierre Henri Simon and others. Albert Einstein. Paris: Hachette, 1966.
  - English translation: Einstein. Peebles Press, 1979.
- Recherches d'un demi-siècle (Research of a half-century), Albin Michel, 1976.
- Les incertitudes d'Heisenberg et l'interprétation probabiliste de la mécanique ondulatoire (Heisenberg uncertainty and wave mechanics probabilistic interpretation), Gauthier-Villars, 1982.

== Notes ==
French nobility
Preceded by Maurice de Broglie	Duke of Broglie; 1960–1987	Succeeded by Victor-François de Broglie
