= Wassigny =

- Commune
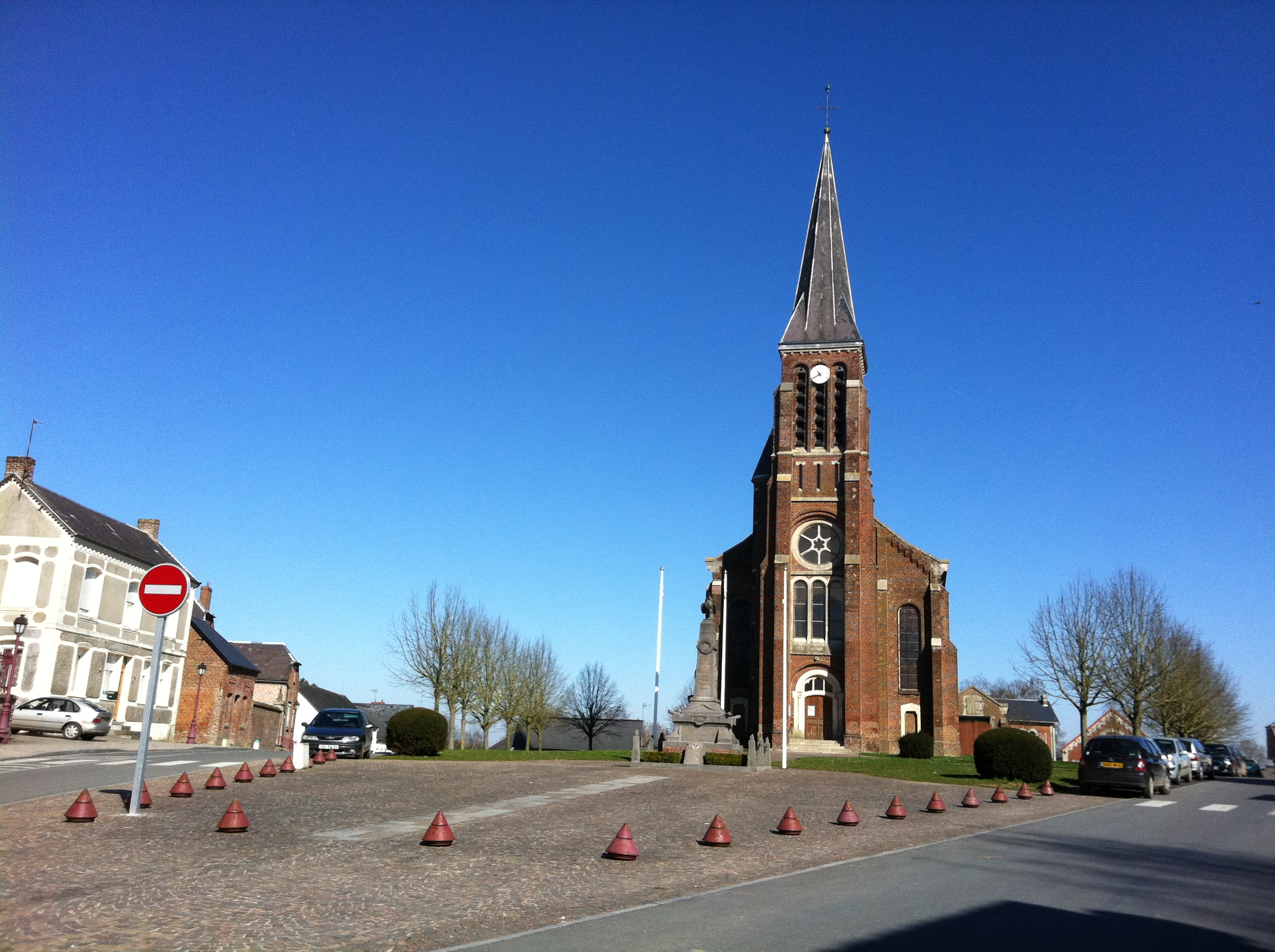
- The church of Wassigny

- Coat of arms
- Location of Wassigny
- Location within France Location within Hauts-de-France
- Coordinates: 50°00′50″N 3°36′03″E
- Country: France
- Region: Hauts-de-France
- Department: Aisne
- Arrondissement: Vervins
- Canton: Guise
- Intercommunality: Thiérache Sambre et Oise

Government
  - Mayor (2026–32): Franck Lépousez
- Area^{1}: 6.79 km^{2} (2.62 sq mi)
- Elevation: 145 m (476 ft)
- Highest elevation: 161 m (528 ft)
- Lowest elevation: 137 m (449 ft)
- Population (2023): 927
  - Density: 137/km^{2} (354/sq mi)
- Time zone: UTC+01:00 (CET)
  - Summer (DST): UTC+02:00 (CEST)
- INSEE/Postal code: 02830 /02630
- ^{1} French Land Register data, which excludes lakes, ponds, glaciers > 1 km^{2} (0.386 sq mi or 247 acres) and river estuaries.

Wassigny (French pronunciation: [wasiɲi]) is a commune in the Aisne department in Hauts-de-France in northern France.

== Population ==
Historical population
Year	Pop.	±% p.a.
1968	1,036	—
1975	1,011	−0.35%
1982	1,047	+0.50%
1990	1,043	−0.05%
1999	1,026	−0.18%
2007	991	−0.43%
2012	968	−0.47%
2017	959	−0.19%
2023	927	−0.56%
Source: INSEE

== See also ==
- Communes of the Aisne department
