= Philippe Maurice de Broglie, 9th Duke of Broglie =

French aristocrat

Philippe Maurice de Broglie, 9th Duke of Broglie (Philippe Maurice Albert Victor Amédée César; born 28 September 1960) is a French aristocrat and duke.

The duke was born in Paris as the second son of Prince Jean de Broglie (1921–1976) and Micheline Segard (1925–1997). He inherited the dukedom after the death of his older brother Victor François in 2012.

The duke's heir presumptive is his younger brother, Louis Albert de Broglie (born 15 March 1963), prince of Broglie.

French nobility
Preceded by Victor-François de Broglie	Duke of Broglie; 2012–present	Incumbent
