= Victor de Broglie (1846–1906) =

French aristocrat (1846-1906)

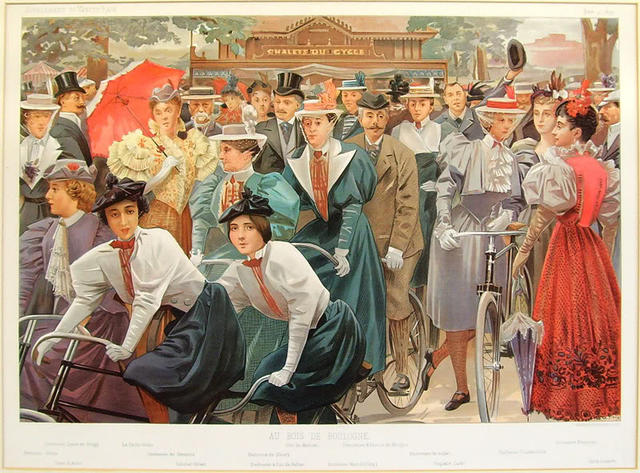
Broglie and his wife appear at the centre of a fashionable crowd in the Bois de Boulogne drawn by Guth, 1897

Louis-Alphonse-Victor, 5th duc de Broglie, called Victor de Broglie (French: [viktɔʁ də bʁɔj]; 30 October 1846 – 26 August 1906), was a French aristocrat.

== Biography ==
Victor de Broglie was born in Rome, Italy where his father, monarchist politician Albert, 4th duc de Broglie, held a diplomatic post.

On 26 September 1871, he married Pauline de La Forest d'Armaillé (1851–1928) in Paris. With her, he had four children who survived to adulthood, including two sons, Maurice and Louis, both of whom were physicists, and both of whom would hold the ducal title. Louis would win the Nobel Prize for Physics and go on to win other national and international honors over his long life.

De Broglie acceded to the title of duc de Broglie on his father's death in 1901 but died only a few years later, passing the title to his eldest son, Maurice.

Maurice died in 1960 and was succeeded by his brother Louis, who died in 1987. Maurice had no surviving children, while Louis died unmarried, and the title passed collaterally to Victor-François, a descendant of the 5th Duke's third younger brother.

French nobility
Preceded by Albert de Broglie	Duke of Broglie; 1901–1906	Succeeded by Maurice de Broglie
