= House of Broglie =

Noble family

de Broglie
- Noble family
- Or a saltire anchored azure.
- Country: France

The House of Broglie (/ˈbroʊɡli/, also US: /broʊˈɡliː, brɔɪ/; French: Maison de Broglie, pronounced [də bʁɔj] or [də bʁœj]) is an old and distinguished French noble family, originally Piedmontese, who migrated to France in the year 1643. Members of this family bore the title of Prince of the Holy Roman Empire, granted to them in 1759 by Francis I, Holy Roman Emperor.

== History ==
Broglia (pronounced [ˈbrɔʎʎa]) was the name of an old Piedmontese noble family, from which were descended the counts of Casalborgone, Mombello and Revello, and the lords of Arignano, Cortandone, Fontanetto Po, Chieri, Cocconato, Monale, Montaldo, Pont Canavese and Santena.

The first reference to the name is dated 1245, mentioning one Ardizzone Broglia, father of Guglielmo, decurione of Chieri.

The founder of the French de Broglie line was Francesco Maria, count of Revello, of the Broglia di Chieri family. Born in 1611 in Piedmont, he took service in the French army in the Thirty Years' War and was naturalized in France after 1643. He is now known as François-Marie, comte de Broglie. After distinguishing himself as a soldier, he died, a lieutenant-general, at the siege of Valenza on 2 July 1656.

His son, Victor-Maurice, comte de Broglie (1647–1727), served under Condé, Turenne and other great commanders of the age of Louis XIV. He became maréchal de camp in 1676, lieutenant-general in 1688, and finally marshal of France in 1724.

His grandson, François-Marie, was made duc de Broglie and a peer of France in 1742. His great-grandson, Victor-François, 2nd duc de Broglie, was created Prince of the Holy Roman Empire in 1759 by Emperor Francis I.

All junior members of the House of Broglie bear the title of prince de Broglie, while the head of the family is the duc de Broglie. A junior line used the title of prince de Broglie-Revel, after one of its lordships.

Louis, 7th duc de Broglie (1892–1987), a physicist and Nobel laureate, was one of the founders of quantum theory.

== Family members ==
=== Comtes de Broglie ===
- François-Marie, comte de Broglie (1611–1656), soldier
- Victor-Maurice, comte de Broglie (1647–1727), marshal of France

=== Ducs de Broglie ===
- François-Marie, 1st duc de Broglie (1671–1745), marshal of France and governor of Strasbourg
- Victor-François, 2nd duc de Broglie (1718–1804), marshal of France
- Victor, 3rd duc de Broglie (1785–1870), statesman and diplomat, member of the Académie française
- Albert, 4th duc de Broglie (1821–1901), politician and writer, Prime Minister of France, member of the Académie française
- Victor, 5th duc de Broglie (1846–1906)
- Maurice, 6th duc de Broglie (1875–1960), physicist, member of the Académie française and the Académie des sciences
- Louis, 7th duc de Broglie (1892–1987), physicist and Nobel laureate, member of the Académie française and the Académie des sciences
- Victor-François, 8th duc de Broglie (1949–2012)
- Philippe-Maurice, 9th duc de Broglie (born 1960)

=== Other noteworthy family members ===
- Charles-François de Broglie, marquis de Ruffec (1719–1781), a son of the first duke, soldier and diplomat.
- Charles-Louis-Victor, prince de Broglie (1756–1794), served in the army, attaining the rank of maréchal de camp.
- Maurice-Jean de Broglie (1766–1821), bishop.
- Louise de Broglie, Countess d'Haussonville (1818–1882), novelist and biographer, painted by Ingres
- Daisy Fellowes (1890–1962), style icon and married to Jean Amédée Marie Anatole de Broglie, prince de Broglie (1886-1918)
- Jean de Broglie (1921–1976), assassinated politician
- Yolande de Broglie-Revel (1928–2014), first wife of Prince Michel of Bourbon-Parma
- Gabriel de Broglie (1931–2025), historian and statesman, member of the Académie française
- Jane Thylda (1869–1935), wife of Auguste de Broglie-Revel
