= Victor-Maurice, comte de Broglie =

Marshal of France

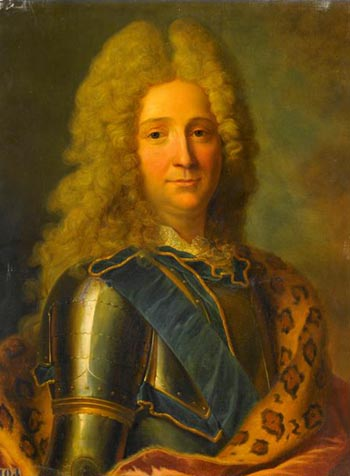
- Born: 12 March 1647; De Broglie house, France
- Died: 4 August 1727 (aged 80)
- Occupations: Soldier and General
- Children: François-Marie de Broglie

Victor-Maurice, comte de Broglie (French: [viktɔʁ mɔʁis də bʁɔj]; 12 March 1647 – 4 August 1727) was a French Royal Army officer.

== Biography ==
Victor-Maurice de Broglie was born in the De Broglie house, a noble family originally from Piedmont. He was the son of François-Marie, comte de Broglie and Olympe-Catherine de Vassal, Countess of Favria. After the death of his father he inherited the countships of Revello and de Broglie, the marquisate of Senonches and also received the Government of La Bassee, near Lille.

Hen served in the Franco-Dutch War under Condé and Turenne, and distinguished himself in the Battles of Seneffe, Mulhouse (1674) and the Siege of Maastricht (1676). He was promoted to brigadier in 1675 and maréchal de camp in 1677.

After the Siege of Luxembourg (1684) and Fribourg, he became lieutenant-general in 1688, and was sent to the Languedoc to suppress the Revolt of the Camisards, until he was replaced in February 1703. He received no more commands on the battlefield, but was finally made marshal of France in 1724, just three years before his death.

=== Marriage and children ===
He married on 27 August 1666 Marie de Lamoignou, daughter of Guillaume de Lamoignon, first president of the Parliament of Paris.

Seven children were born of this union :

- Joseph-Hyacinthe de Broglie (1667-1693), killed at the Siege of Charleroi (1693)
- Charles-Guillaume, Marquis de Broglie (1669-1751), his heir, Lieutenant General, had issue
- François-Marie de Broglie (1671-1745), Marshal of France, 1st Duke of Broglie, had issue
- Achille de Broglie (1672-1750), Lord of Helloy, known as the "Chevalier de Broglie," Lieutenant General of the Naval Armies
- Charles-Maurice de Broglie (1682-1766), Abbot of Mont-Saint-Michel Abbey and Vaux-de-Cernay Abbey
- Victor de Broglie (1689-1719), Knight Hospitaller
- Marie-Madeleine de Broglie (died 1699), married to Jean-Mathias Riquet de Bonrepos.
