= Jean de Broglie =

French politician (1921–1976)

Prince Jean Marie François Ferdinand de Broglie (French: [viktɔʁ də bʁɔj]; 1921–1976) was a French politician who held several prominent government positions between 1962 and 1967 during the presidency of Charles de Gaulle. He also served in the National Assembly as a deputy for Eure from 1958 until his death. He was assassinated on 24 December 1976.

== Family ==
Jean de Broglie was born in Paris on 21 June 1921. He was the first son of Prince Eugène Marie Amédée de Broglie (1891–1957), grandson of Prince François Marie Albert de Broglie (1851–1939), and the great-grandson of Albert de Broglie, 4th duc de Broglie. Albert de Broglie's mother, Albertine de Staël-Holstein (1797–1838), was the daughter of French writer Germaine de Staël and, reputedly, the daughter of novelist Benjamin Constant.

=== Marriage ===
Jean de Broglie married Micheline Segard (1925–1997) and they had three sons.

=== Children ===
Jean de Broglie had three children with Micheline Segard:

- Victor François de Broglie (Paris, 25 March 1949 - Broglie, 12 February 2012), 8th duke of Broglie, who succeeded a distinguished distant cousin, Louis de Broglie, 7th duke of Broglie (1892–1987), physicist and Nobel laureate
- Philippe Maurice de Broglie (Paris, 28 September 1960), 9th duke of Broglie
- Louis-Albert de Broglie (Paris, 15 March 1963), prince of Broglie

== Career ==
Jean de Broglie held several top positions in the government of France:

- Negotiator of the Évian Accords.
- Secrétaire d'État chargé de la Fonction publique (April to November 1962)
- Secrétaire d'État aux Affaires algériennes (1962–1966)
- Secrétaire d'État aux Affaires étrangères (1966–1967)

He also held numerous elective offices, notably as a deputy for Eure in the National Assembly elected in 1958, 1962, 1967, 1968 and 1973

== Death ==
Jean de Broglie was assassinated on 24 December 1976 while leaving the home of Pierre de Varga, his financial advisor. Varga was quickly arrested; in 1981, Varga was sentenced to ten years' imprisonment for complicity in the murder.

== See also ==
- Éric Yung
