= Coronation =

Ceremony marking the investiture of a monarch

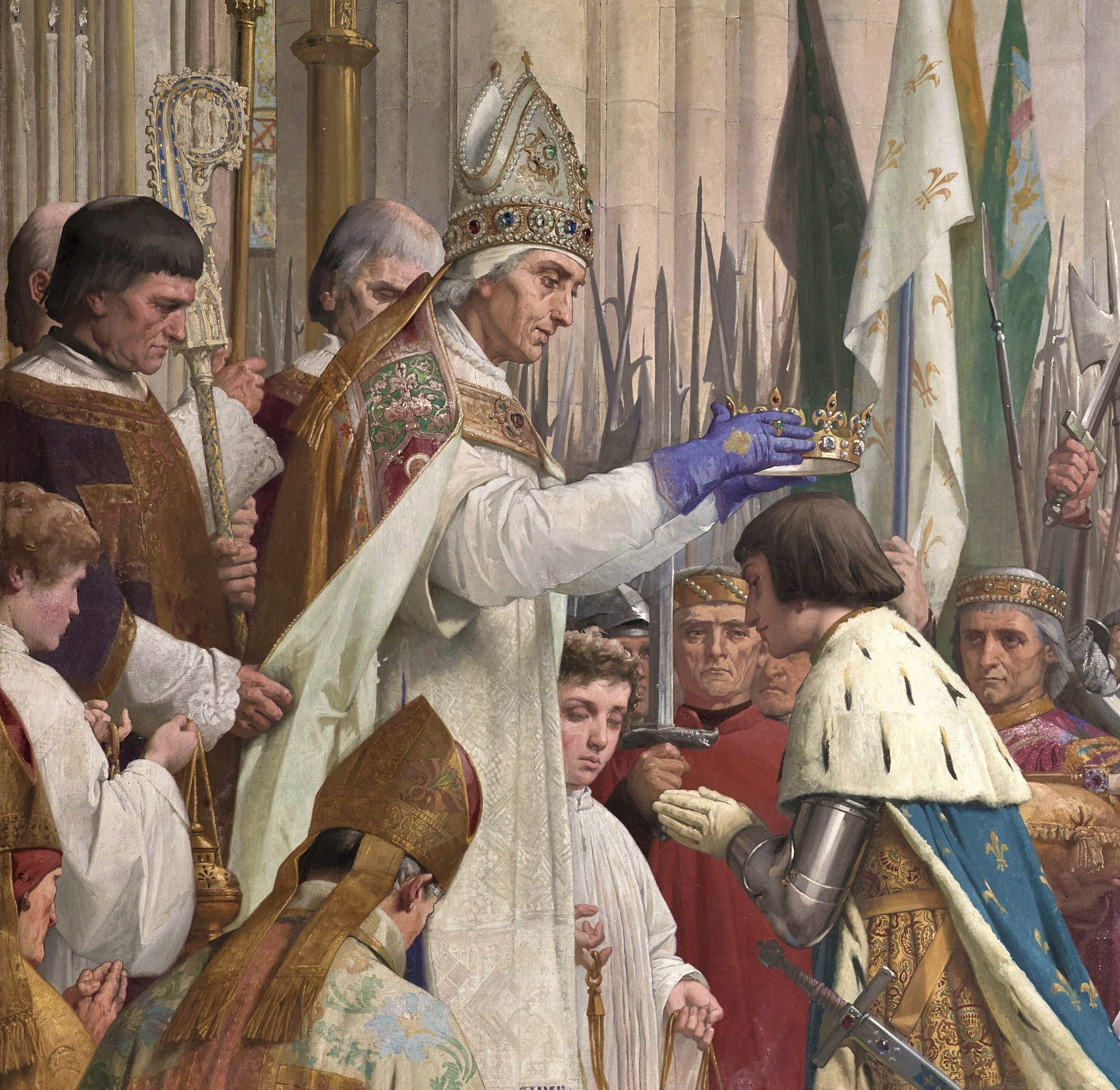
The coronation of Charles VII of France (1429), detail of the painting Jeanne d'Arc (1886–1890) by Jules Eugène Lenepveu

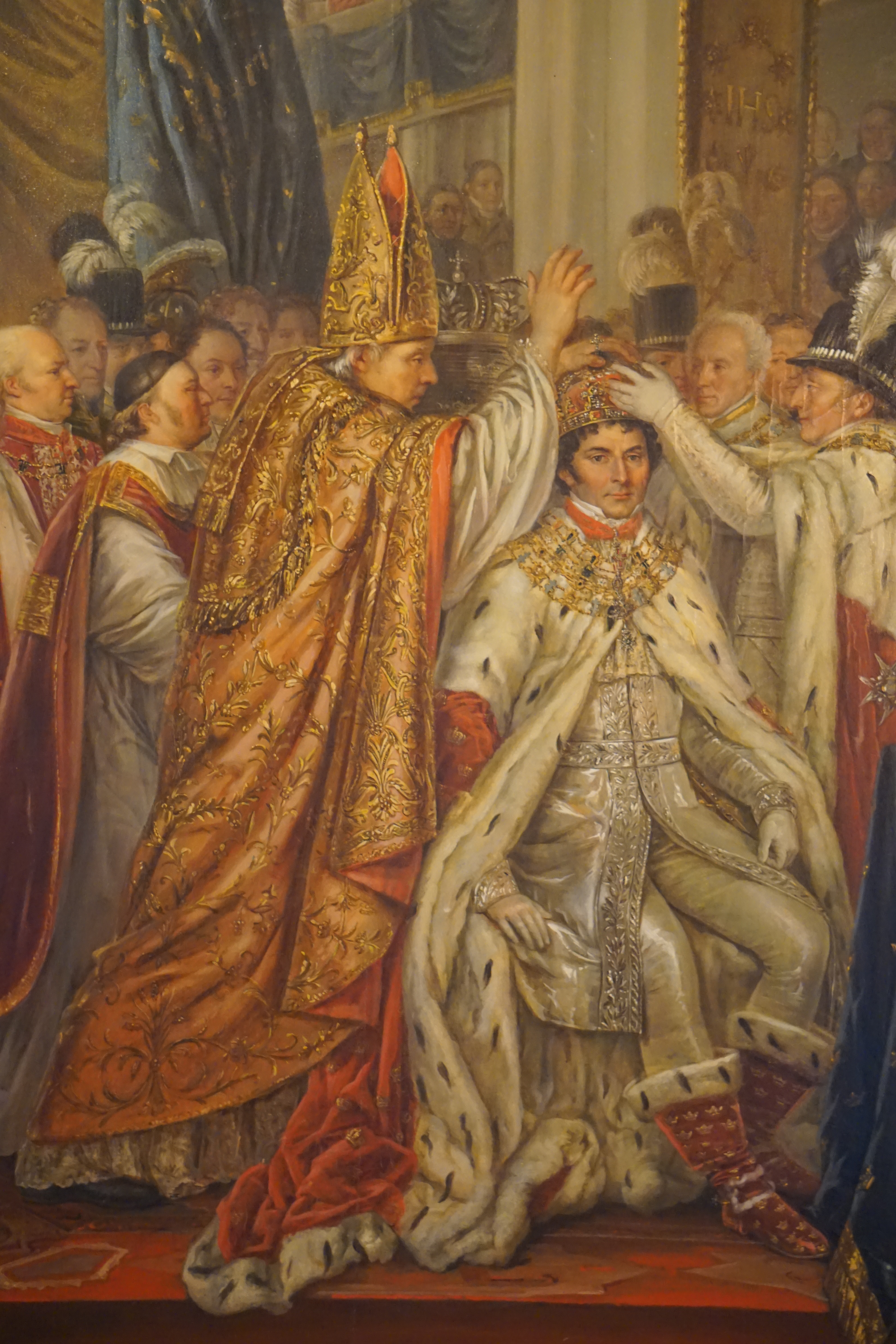
The coronation of Charles XIV John of Sweden, by Evangelical-Lutheran archbishop Jacob Axelsson Lindblom (1818); detail of the painting by Per Krafft the Younger

A coronation ceremony marks the formal investiture of a monarch with regal power using a crown. In addition to the crowning, this ceremony may include the presentation of other items of regalia, and other rituals such as the taking of special vows by the new monarch, the investing and presentation of regalia to them, and acts of homage by the new monarch's subjects. In certain Christian denominations, such as Lutheranism and Anglicanism, coronation is a religious rite. As such, Western-style coronations have often included anointing the monarch with holy oil, or chrism as it is often called; the anointing ritual's religious significance follows examples found in the Bible. The monarch's consort may also be crowned, either simultaneously with the monarch or as a separate event.

Once a vital ritual, coronations have changed over time for a variety of socio-political and religious reasons; most modern monarchies have dispensed with them altogether, preferring simpler ceremonies to mark a monarch's accession. Coronations are still observed in the United Kingdom, Tonga, Thailand, Malaysia (federal and state), and Eswatini. The most recent coronation in the world was that of King Charles III and Queen Camilla in London in 2023. In Europe, most monarchs are required to take a simple oath in the presence of the country's legislature. Besides a coronation, a monarch's accession may be marked in many ways: some nations may retain a religious dimension to their accession rituals, while others have adopted simpler inauguration ceremonies, or even no ceremony at all. Some cultures use bathing or cleansing rites, the drinking of a sacred beverage, or other religious practices to achieve a comparable effect. Such acts symbolise the granting of divine favour to the monarch within the relevant spiritual-religious paradigm of the country.

"Coronation" in common parlance today may also, in a broader sense, refer to any formal ceremony in relation to the accession of a monarch, whether or not an actual crown is bestowed, such ceremonies may otherwise be referred to as investitures, inaugurations, or enthronements. The monarch's accession usually precedes the coronation ceremony. For example, the Coronation of Charles III took place in May 2023, several months after his accession to the throne on the death of his mother Elizabeth II.

== History and development ==
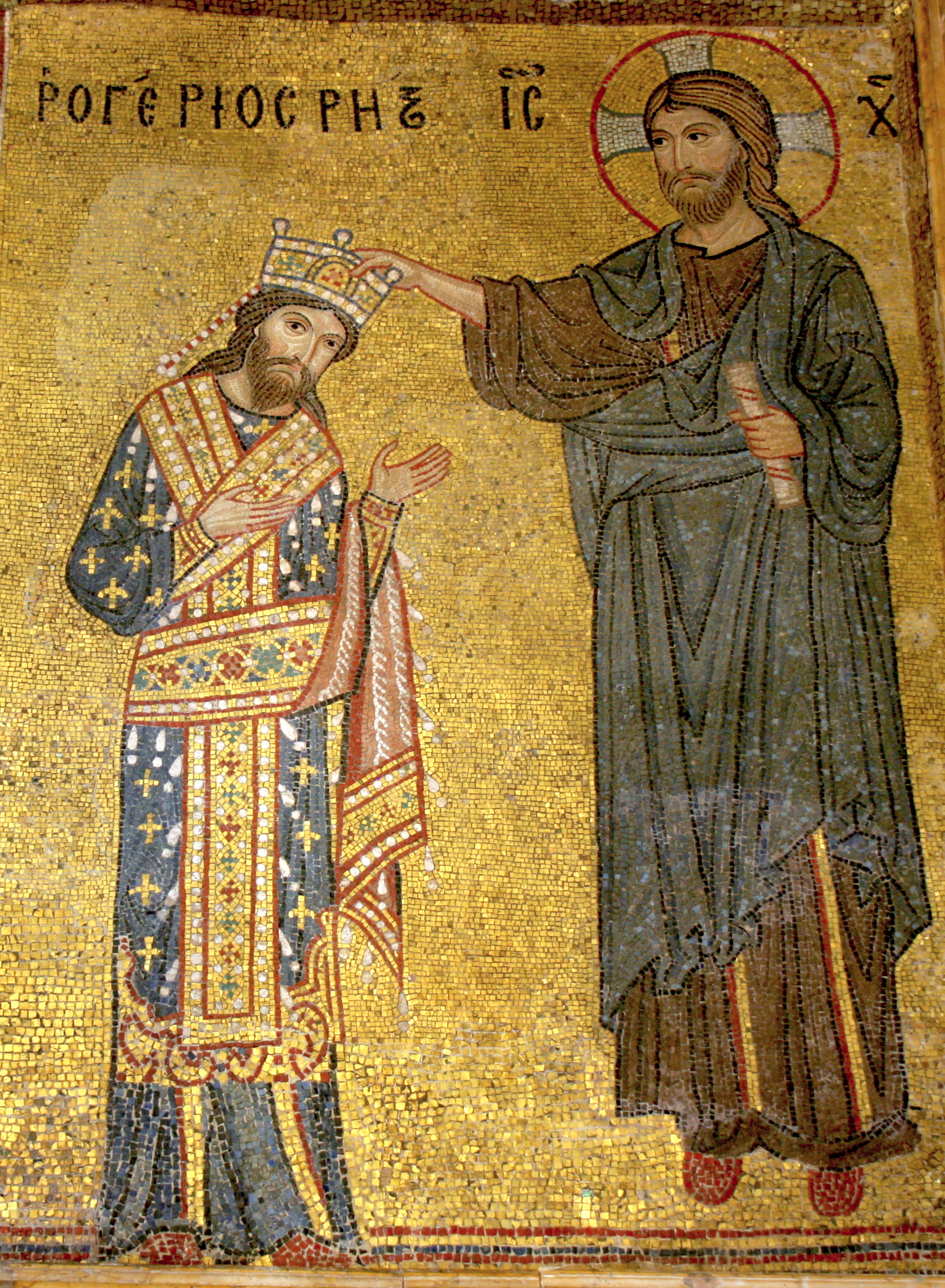
Roger II of Sicily receiving his crown directly from Jesus Christ, mosaic from Martorana, Palermo

The coronation ceremonies in medieval Christendom, both Western and Eastern, are influenced by the practice of the Roman Emperors as it developed during Late Antiquity and by Biblical accounts of kings being crowned and anointed. The European coronation ceremonies, perhaps best known in the form they have taken in Great Britain (the most recent of which occurred in 2023), descend from rites initially created in Byzantium, Visigothic Spain, Carolingian France and the Holy Roman Empire and brought to their apogee during the Medieval era.

In non-Christian states, coronation rites evolved from a variety of sources, often related to the religious beliefs of that particular nation. Buddhism, for instance, influenced the coronation rituals of Thailand, Cambodia and Bhutan, while Hindu elements played a significant role in Nepalese rites. The ceremonies used in modern Egypt, Malaysia, Brunei and Iran were shaped by Islam, while Tonga's ritual combines ancient Polynesian influences with more modern Anglican ones.

=== Antiquity ===
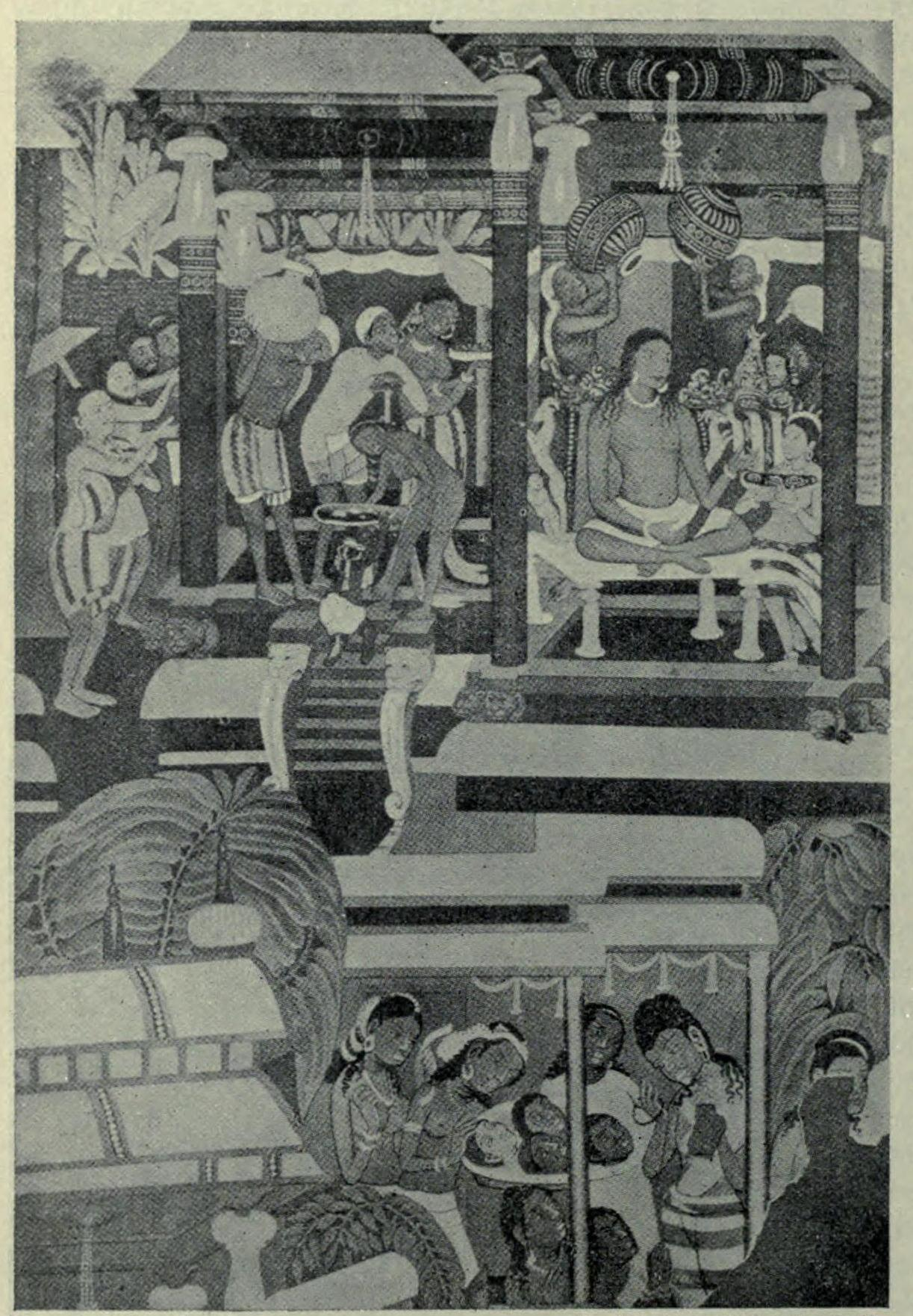
An ancient coronation from the Indian subcontinent

The corona radiata, the "radiant crown" known best on the Statue of Liberty, and perhaps worn by the Helios that was the Colossus of Rhodes, was worn by Roman emperors as part of the cult of Sol Invictus, part of the imperial cult as it developed during the 3rd century. The origin of the crown is thus religious, comparable to the significance of a halo, marking the sacral nature of kingship, expressing that either the king is himself divine, or ruling by divine right.

The precursor to the crown was the browband called the diadem, which had been worn by the Achaemenid rulers, was adopted by Constantine I, and was worn by all subsequent rulers of the later Roman Empire. Following the assumption of the diadem by Constantine, Roman and Byzantine emperors continued to wear it as the supreme symbol of their authority. Although no specific coronation ceremony was observed at first, one gradually evolved over the following century. Emperor Julian the Apostate was hoisted upon a shield and crowned with a gold necklace provided by one of his standard-bearers; he later wore a jewel-studded diadem. Later emperors were crowned and acclaimed in a similar manner, until the momentous decision was taken to permit the patriarch of Constantinople to physically place the crown on the emperor's head.

The first imperial coronation was organised by Leo I, who was crowned by Patriarch Anatolius of Constantinople in 457. This Christian coronation ritual was performed by almost all future emperors, and was later imitated by courts all over Europe. This ritual included recitation of prayers by the Byzantine prelate over the crown, a further—and extremely vital—development in the liturgical ordo of crowning. After this event, according to the Catholic Encyclopedia, "the ecclesiastical element in the coronation ceremonial rapidly develop[ed]".

In some European Celtic or Germanic countries prior to the adoption of Christianity, the ruler upon his election was raised on a shield and, while standing upon it, was borne on the shoulders of several chief men of the nation (or tribe) in a procession around his assembled subjects. This was usually performed three times. Following this, the king was given a spear, and a diadem wrought of silk or linen (not to be confused with a crown) was bound around his forehead as a token of regal authority.

=== Middle Ages ===
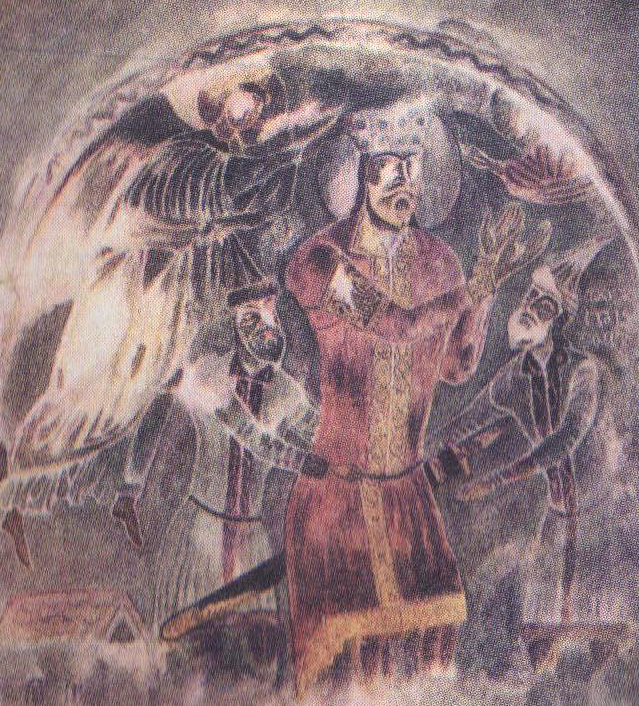
The coronation of King Demetrius I of Georgia by the angels, 12th century

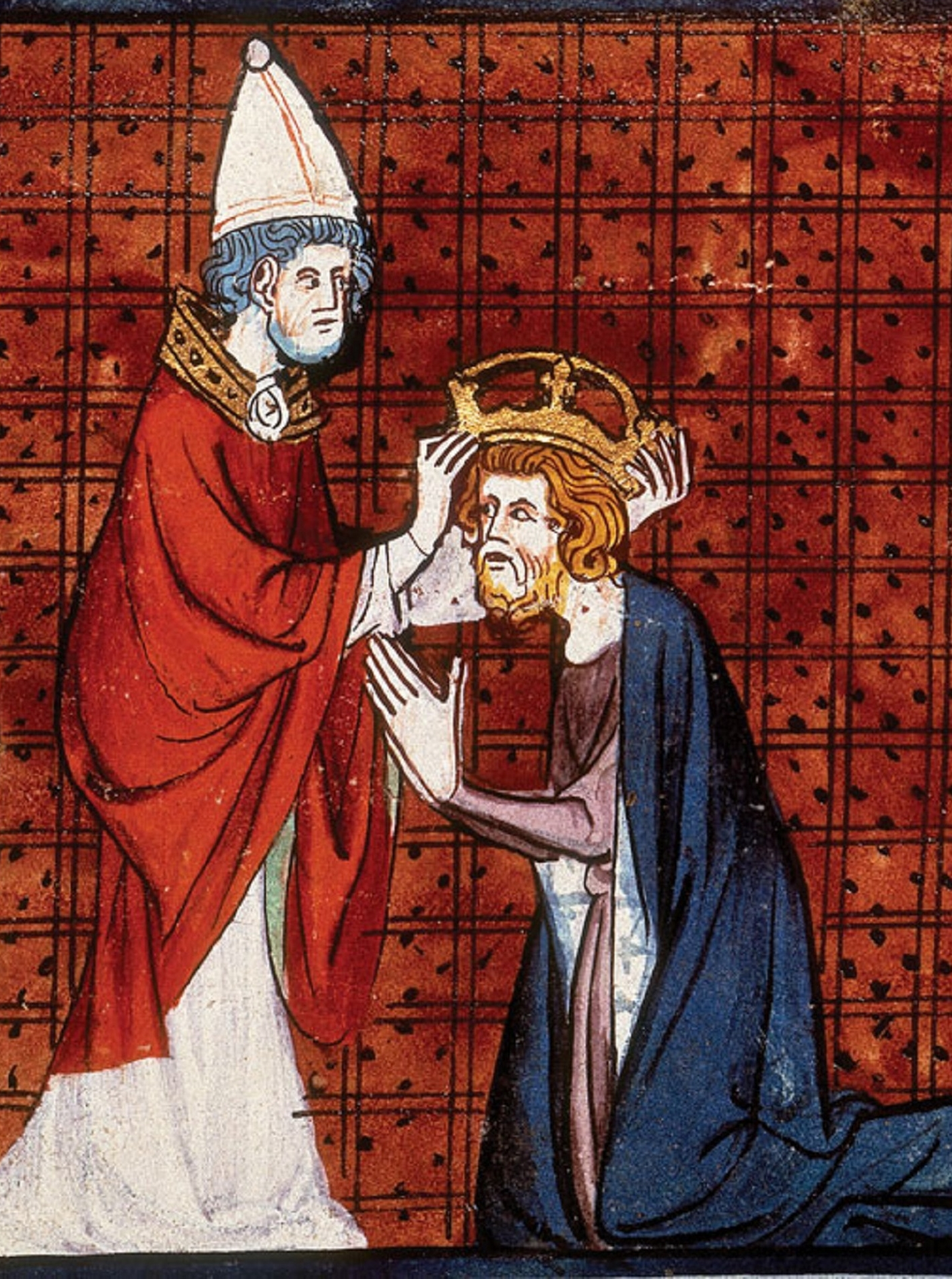
Miniature of Charlemagne crowned emperor by Pope Leo III, from Chroniques de France ou de Saint Denis, vol. 1; France, second quarter of 14th century.

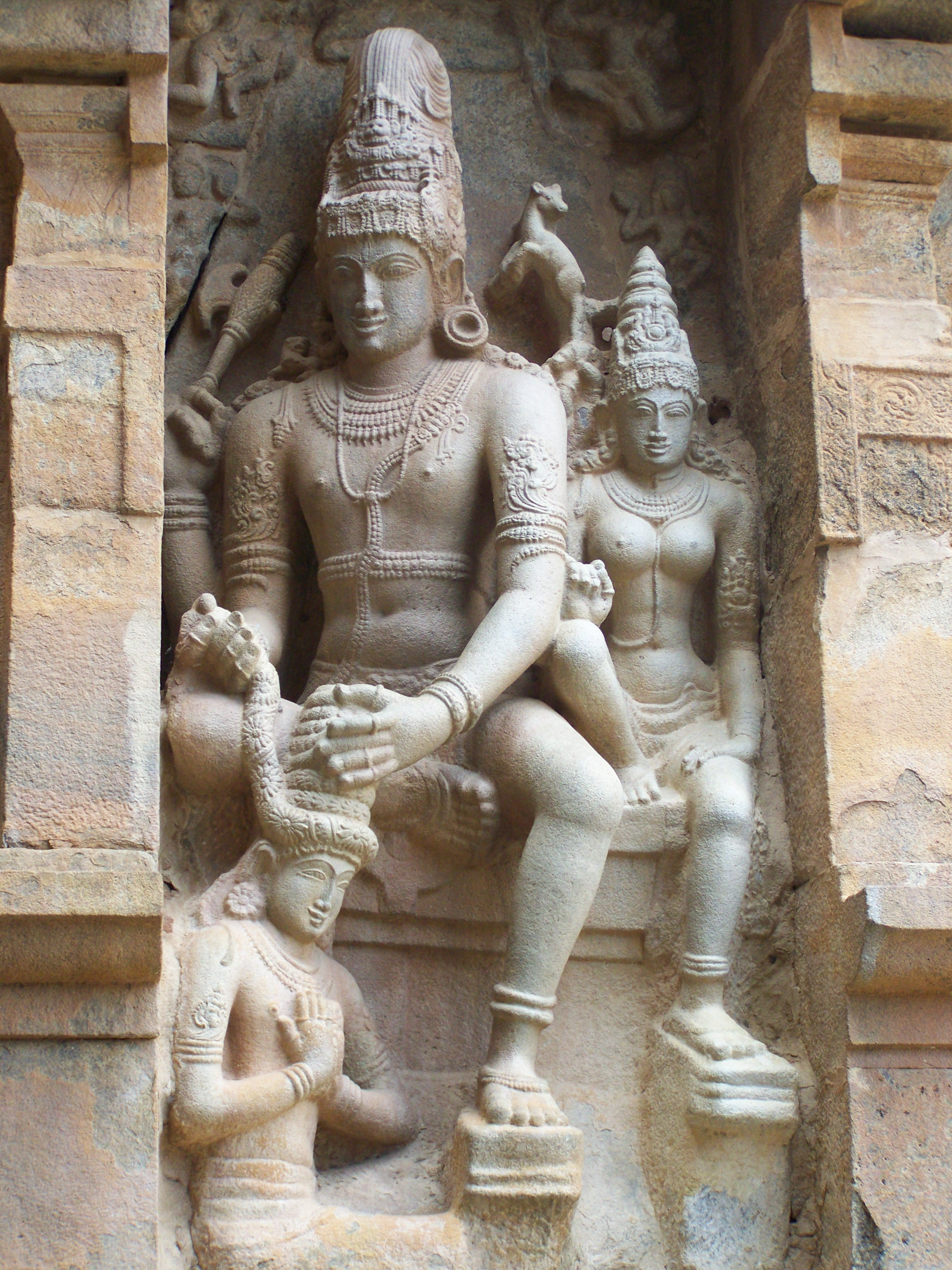
The coronation of Emperor Rajendra I by Shiva and Parvati, 1014 CE.

According to Adomnan of Iona, the king of Dal Riata, Áedán mac Gabráin, came to the monastery at Iona in 574 to be crowned by St Columba. In Spain, the Visigothic king Sisenand was crowned in 631, and in 672, Wamba was the first occidental king to be anointed as well, by the archbishop of Toledo. In England, the Anglo-Saxon king Eardwulf of Northumbria was "consecrated and enthroned" in 796, and Æthelstan was crowned and anointed in 925. These practices were nevertheless irregularly used or occurred some considerable time after the rulers had become kings, until their regular adoption by the Carolingian dynasty in France. To legitimate his deposition of the last of the Merovingian kings, Pepin the Short was twice crowned and anointed, at the beginning of his reign in 752, and for the first time by a pope in 754 in Saint-Denis. The anointing served as a reminder of the baptism of Clovis I in Reims in 496, where the ceremony was finally transferred in 816. His son Charlemagne, who was crowned emperor in Rome in 800, passed as well the ceremony to the Holy Roman Empire, and this tradition acquired a newly constitutive function in England too, with the kings Harold Godwinson and William the Conqueror immediately crowned in Westminster Abbey in 1066.

The European coronation ceremonies of the Middle Ages were essentially a combination of the Christian rite of anointing with additional elements. Following Europe's conversion to Christianity, crowning ceremonies became more and more ornate, depending on the country in question, and their Christian elements—especially anointing—became the paramount concern. Crowns and sceptres, used in coronations since ancient times, took on a Christian significance together with the orb as symbols of the purported divine order of things, with the monarch as the divinely ordained overlord and protector of his dominion. During the Middle Ages, this rite was considered so vital in some European kingdoms that it was sometimes referred to as an "eighth sacrament". The anointed ruler was viewed as a mixta persona, part priest and part layman, but never wholly either. This notion persisted into the twentieth century in Imperial Russia, where the Tsar was considered to be "wedded" to his subjects through the Orthodox coronation service. Coronation stones marked the site of some medieval ceremonies, though some alleged stones are later inventions.

As reported by the jurisconsult Tancredus, initially only four monarchs were crowned and anointed: they were the Kings of Jerusalem, France, England and Sicily.

Et sunt quidam coronando, et quidam non, tamen illi, qui coronatur, debent inungi: et tales habent privilegium ab antiquo, et de consuetudine. Alii modo non debent coronari, nec inungi sine istis: et si faciunt; ipsi abutuntur indebite. [...] Rex Hierosolymorum coronatur et inungitur; Rex Francorum Christianissimus coronatur et inungitur; Rex Anglorum coronatur et inungitur; Rex Siciliae coronatur et inungitur.

Translation:

And some [kings] are crowned and some are not; however those who are crowned must be anointed: they have this privilege by ancient custom. The others, instead, must not be crowned nor anointed: and if they do so, it is undue abuse. [...] The King of Jerusalem is crowned and anointed, the Most Christian King of France is crowned and anointed, the King of England is crowned and anointed; the King of Sicily is crowned and anointed.

Crowning ceremonies arose from a worldview in which monarchs were seen as ordained by God to serve not merely as political or military leaders, nor as figureheads, but rather to occupy a vital spiritual place in their dominions as well. Coronations were created to reflect and enable these alleged connections; however, the belief systems that gave birth to them have been radically altered in recent centuries by secularism, egalitarianism and the rise of constitutionalism and democracy.

By the time of the French Revolution, the "blanket of divine-right monarch royal power was constantly being challenged."

=== Modern history ===
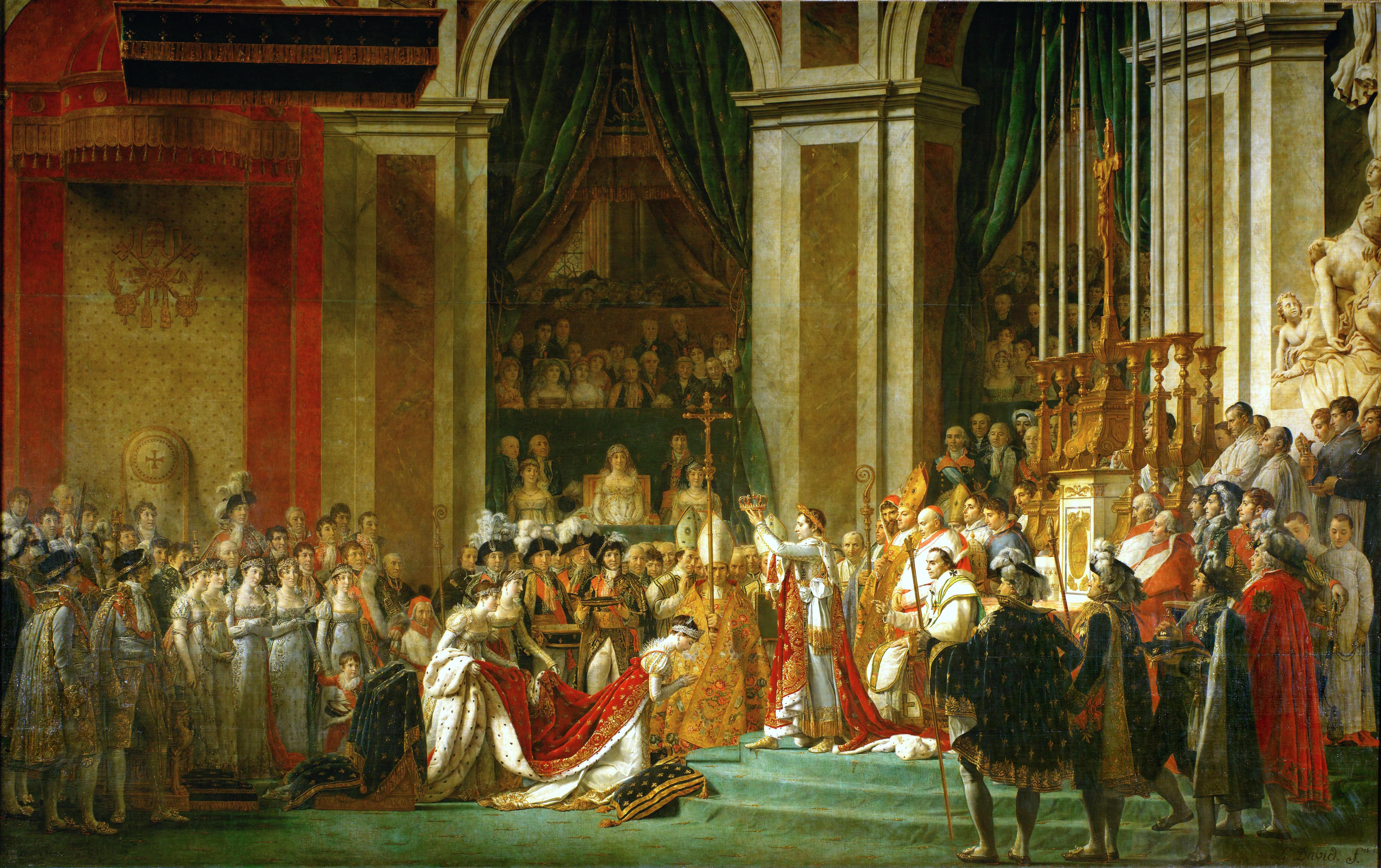
The coronation of Napoleon, in the Cathedral of Notre Dame on 2 December 1804, by Jacques-Louis David

The Age of Enlightenment and various revolutions of the last three centuries all helped to further this trend. Hence, many monarchies – especially in Europe – have dispensed with coronations altogether, or transformed them into simpler inauguration or benediction rites. A majority of contemporary European monarchies today have either long abandoned coronation ceremonies (e.g. the last coronation in Spain was in 1379, and it was seldom practised before that) or have never practised coronations (e.g. Belgium, The Netherlands, Luxembourg). Of all European monarchies today, only the United Kingdom still retains its coronation rite. In Evangelical-Lutheran Sweden, King Oscar II, was the last to have the traditional coronation rite (1873), and subsequent monarchs have had simpler enthronement liturgies. Other nations still crowning their rulers include Bhutan, Brunei, Cambodia, Eswatini, Lesotho, Thailand, and Tonga, as well as several subnational entities such as the Toro Kingdom. The Papacy retains the option of a coronation, but no pope has used it since 1963 after Pope John Paul I opted for a papal inauguration in 1978.

=== Canonical coronation ===
A canonical coronation (Latin: coronatio canonica) is a pious institutional act of the Pope, on behalf of a devotion. This tradition still stands as of 2015; in 2014 Pope Francis crowned Our Lady of Immaculate Conception of Juquila. Since 1989, the act has been carried out through the authorised decree by the Congregation for Divine Worship and the Discipline of the Sacraments.

== Coronations and monarchical power ==
In most kingdoms, a monarch succeeding to the throne by right of heredity does so immediately on the death (or abdication) of their predecessor; the coronation ceremony is not until some time later. King Edward VIII of the United Kingdom, for example, did not reign long enough to be crowned before he abdicated, yet he was unquestionably the King of the United Kingdom and Emperor of India during his brief reign. This is because in Britain, the law stipulates that in the moment one monarch dies, the new one assumes automatically and immediately the throne; thus, there is no interregnum.

France likewise followed automatic succession, though by tradition the new king acceded to the throne when the coffin of the previous monarch descended into the vault at Saint Denis Basilica, and the Duke of Uzès proclaimed "Le Roi est mort, vive le Roi!" ("The King is dead, long live the King!").

In Hungary, on the other hand, no ruler was regarded as being truly legitimate until he was physically crowned with St. Stephen's Crown by the archbishop of Esztergom in Székesfehérvár Cathedral (or during the Ottoman Empire's invasion of Hungary in Pozsony, then in Budapest), (Note: An account of this service, written by Count Miklos Banffy, a witness, may be read at The Last Habsburg Coronation: Budapest, 1916. From Theodore's Royalty and Monarchy Website.) while monarchs of Albania were not allowed to succeed or exercise any of their prerogatives until swearing a formal constitutional oath before their nation's parliament. The same still applies in Belgium. Following their election, the kings of Poland were permitted to perform a variety of political acts prior to their coronation, but were not allowed to exercise any of their judicial powers prior to being crowned.

In the Holy Roman Empire an individual became King of the Romans, and thus gained governance of the Empire, upon his acceptance of the election capitulation, not his coronation (unless he was elected during his predecessor's lifetime). However, prior to Maximilian I he could not style himself "Emperor" until his coronation by the Pope, resulting in many individuals being "Kings of the Romans" or "Kings of Germany", but not "Emperor". Maximilian received Papal permission to call himself "Elected Emperor of the Romans" when he was unable to travel for his coronation. His successors likewise adopted the title; the last Emperor crowned by the Pope was Maxmilian's grandson Charles V.

== Coronation of heirs apparent ==
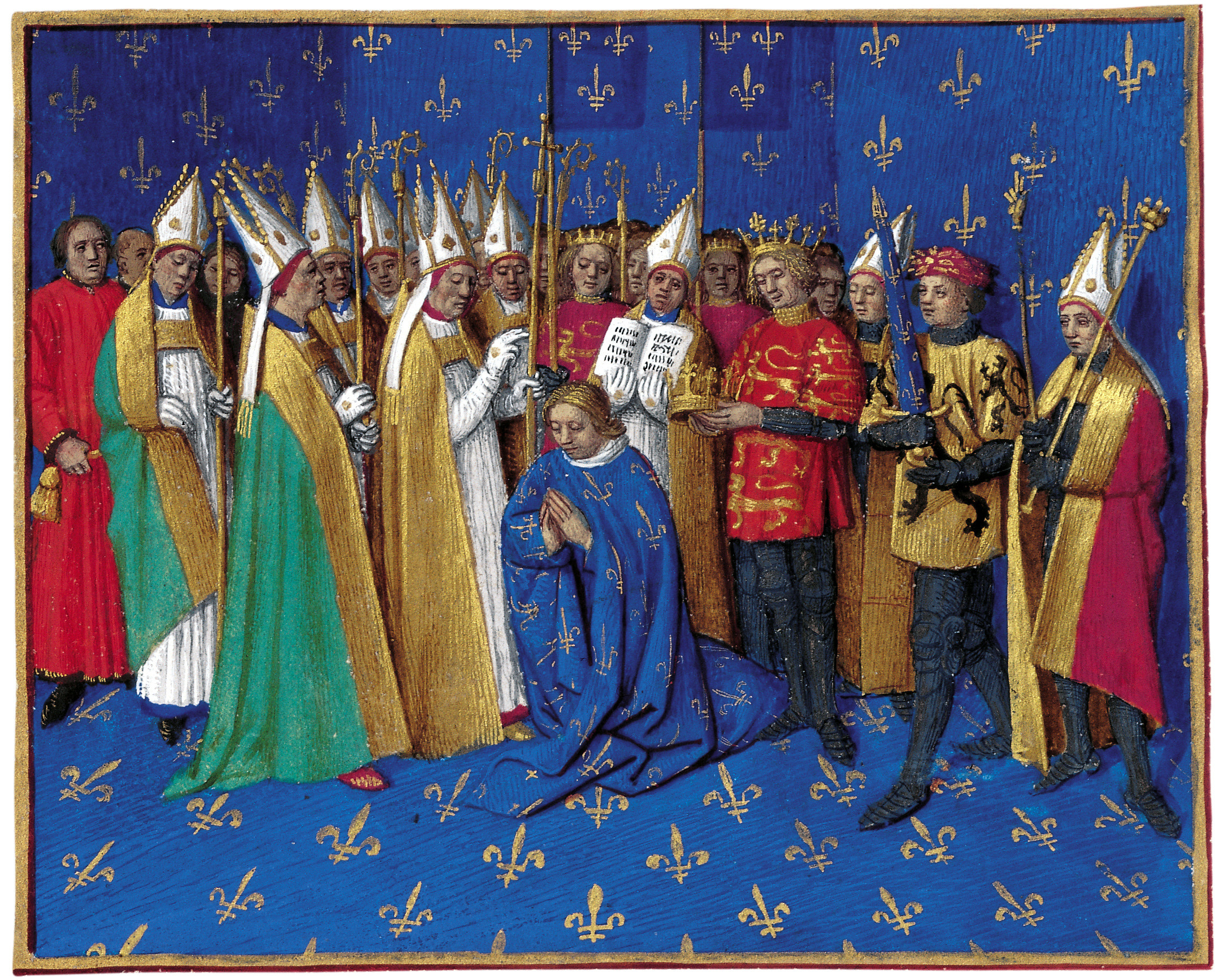
Coronation of Philip, son of King Louis VII of France (later Philip II), as junior king

The custom of crowning heirs apparent also originates from the Roman Empire. Many emperors chose to elevate their children directly to augustus (emperor) instead of leaving them as caesar (heir apparent). These co-emperors did not exercise real power and are often excluded from the numbering of emperors, as their proclamations only served to settle the succession. The first known coronation of a co-emperor occurred in 367, when Valentinian I crowned his eight-year-old son Gratian. After the reign of Leo I, heirs apparent —nominal co-rulers titled augustus and later basileus— were also crowned by the patriarch of Constantinople, as in the case of his six-year-old grandson Leo II in 473.

During the Middle Ages, the Capetian kings of France chose to have their heirs apparent crowned during their own lifetime to avoid succession disputes. This practice was later adopted by Angevin kings of England, kings of Hungary and other European monarchs. From the moment of their coronation, the heirs were regarded as junior kings (rex iunior), but they exercised little power and historically were not included in the numbering of monarchs if they predeceased their fathers. The nobility disliked this custom, as it reduced their chances to benefit from a possible succession dispute.

The last heir apparent to the French throne to be crowned during his father's lifetime was the future Philip II. The only crowned heir apparent to the English throne was Henry the Young King, who was first crowned alone and then with his wife, Margaret of France. King Stephen attempted to have his son Eustace IV of Boulogne crowned in his lifetime but faced serious papal opposition as the Church did not want to be seen as intervening in the Anarchy. The practice was eventually abandoned by all kingdoms that had adopted it, as the rules of primogeniture became stronger. The last coronation of an heir apparent, with the exception of that of the Prince of Wales in 1969, was the coronation of the future Emperor Ferdinand I of Austria as junior King of Hungary in 1830.

== See also ==
- Accession day
- Coronations in Africa
- Coronations in the Americas
- Coronations in Asia
- Coronations in Europe
- Coronations in Oceania
- Coronation of the British monarch
- Coronation of the Emperor of Brazil
- Coronation of the Virgin
- Coronation anthem
- Inauguration
- Anointing
- Enthronement

== Bibliography ==
- Coronations: Medieval and Early Modern Monarchic Ritual. ed. Janos M. Bak. University of California Press 1990. ISBN 978-0520066779.
- (in German) Bernhard A. Macek: Die Kroenung Josephs II. in Frankfurt am Main. Logistisches Meisterwerk, zeremonielle Glanzleistung und Kulturgueter fuer die Ewigkeit. Peter Lang 2010. ISBN 978-3-631-60849-4.
- Zupka, Dušan: Power of rituals and rituals of power: Religious and secular rituals in the political culture of medieval Kingdom of Hungary. IN: Historiography in Motion. Bratislava – Banská Bystrica, 2010, pp. 29–42. ISBN 978-80-89388-31-8.
