= Massacre in the Rue Haxo =

Massacre of priests and gendarmes during the Paris Commune, 1871

- Part of Semaine sanglante
- Location: Rue Haxo, Paris, France
- Date: 26 - 27 May, 1871
- Deaths: 110 Killed
- Victims: Priests and Gendarmes
- Perpetrator: Communards

The Massacre in the Rue Haxo (French: le massacre de la rue Haxo) was a massacre of priests and gendarmes by communards during the semaine sanglante ("bloody week") at the end of the Paris Commune in May 1871.

== Background ==
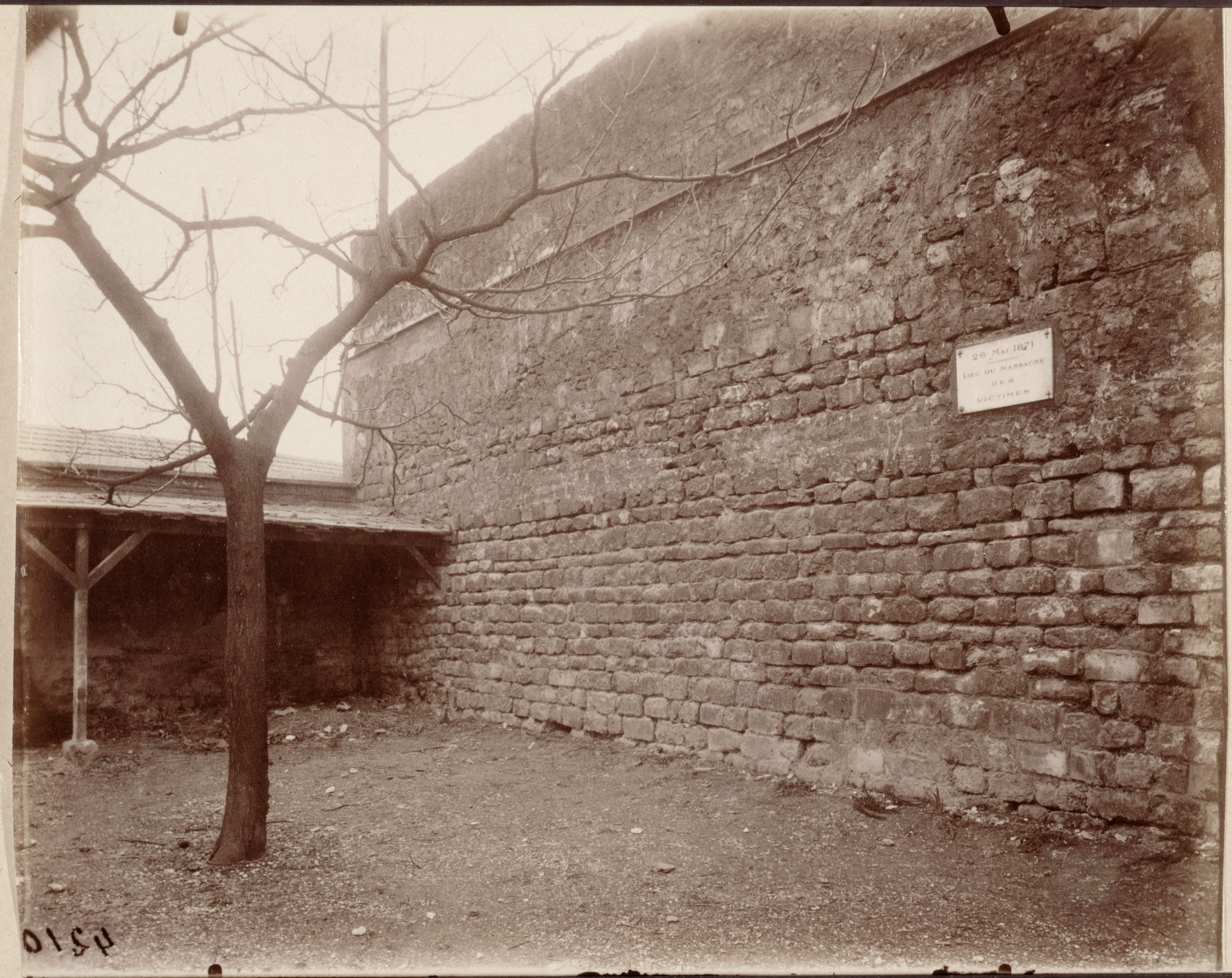
Location of the massacre of rue Haxo (Eugène Atget)

The communards associated the Catholic Church with conservatism and imperialism and enforced a separation between Church and state.

In April, the Commune had arrested some 200 clergy to serve as hostages against reprisals from the Versailles government, and to use in possible prisoner exchanges. In particular, leaders of the Commune hoped to be able to exchange the archbishop of Paris, Georges Darboy, for Louis Auguste Blanqui, but this offer was rebuffed by Adolphe Thiers, president of the Third Republic. Versailles troops entered the city on 21 May, and by 24 May had retaken much of the city. Théophile Ferré signed an order of execution for six of the hostages at la Roquette Prison, specifically including the archbishop; they were executed by firing squad.

== Massacre ==
On 26 May, 50 further hostages from la Roquette Prison were executed, this time publicly in rue Haxo.

On 27 May, some of them attempted to escape; they were immediately killed.

In total, 110 were killed, of whom 75 were clergy and 35 were soldiers.

A chapel was built on the site in 1894, and in 1938 the church in rue Haxo was inaugurated as Notre-Dame-des-Otages (literally "Our Lady of the Hostages").

== Beatification ==
Blesseds Henri Planchat and 4 Companions
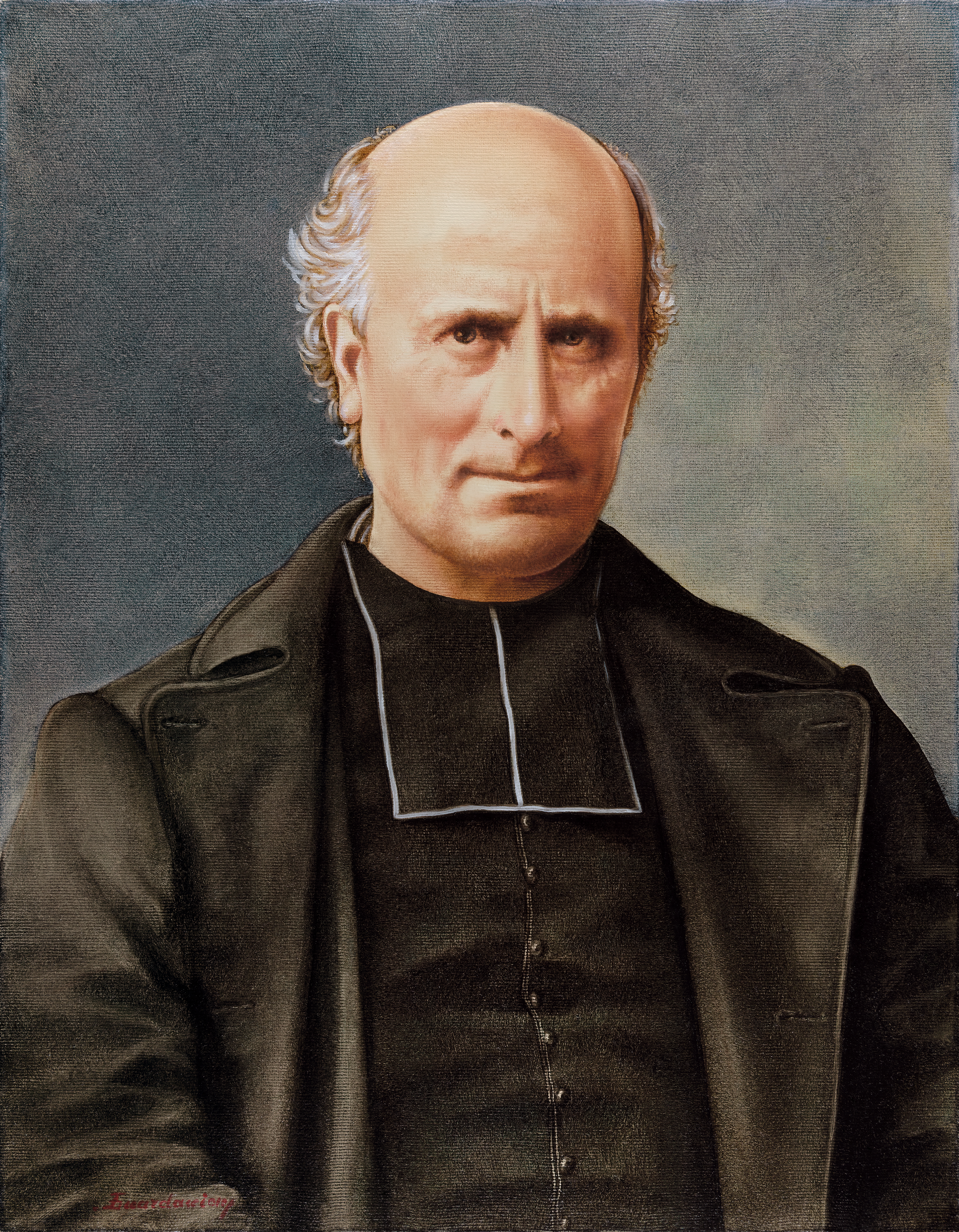
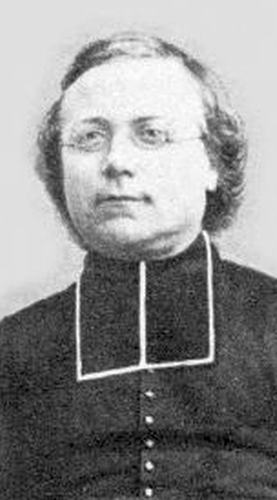
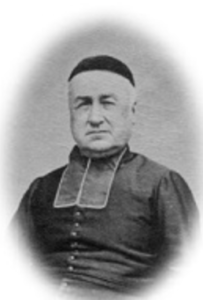
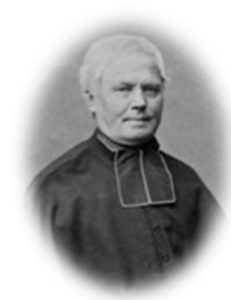
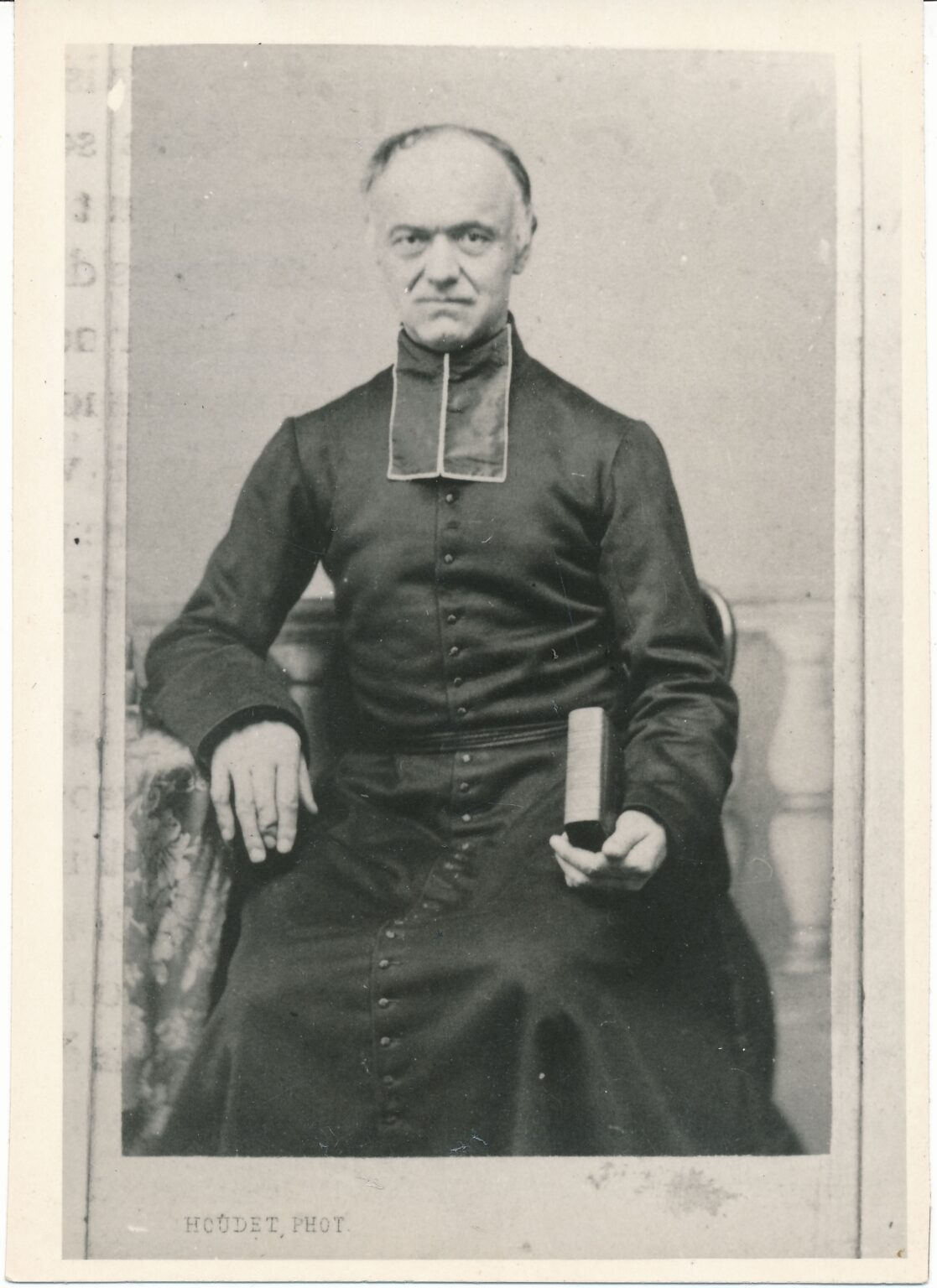

Martyrs
- Born: Henri Planchat : 8 November 1823; Bourbon-Vendée, Vendée, Kingdom of France; Ladislas Radigue : 8 May 1823; Saint-Patrice-du-Désert, Orne, Kingdom of France; Polycarpe Tuffier : 14 March 1807; Le Malzieu, Lozère, French Republic; Marcelino Rouchouze : 14 December 1810; Saint-Julien-en-Genevois, Haute-Savoie, French Empire; Frézal Tardieu : 18 November 1814; Chasseradès, Lozère, Kingdom of France
- Died: Henri Planchat : 26 May 1871 (aged 47); Paris, French Republic; Ladislas Radigue : 26 May 1871 (aged 48); Paris, French Republic; Polycarpe Tuffier : 26 May 1871 (aged 64); Paris, French Republic; Marcelino Rouchouze : 26 May 1871 (aged 60); Paris, French Republic; Frézal Tardieu : 26 May 1871 (aged 56); Paris, French Republic
- Venerated in: Roman Catholic Church
- Beatified: 22 April 2023, Saint-Sulpice Church, Paris, France by Cardinal Marcello Semeraro
- Feast: 26 May

On 25 November 2021, Pope Francis recognized five victims of the 26 May killings as martyrs: Henri Planchat, Ladislas Radigue, Polycarpe Tuffier, Marcellin Rouchouze, and Frézal Tardieu. They were beatified on April 22, 2023, by Cardinal Marcello Semeraro.
