= Notre-Dame-des-Otages, Paris =

Roman Catholic parish church in Paris, France

Coordinates: 48°52′27″N 2°24′11″E

Notre-Dame des Otages, Paris
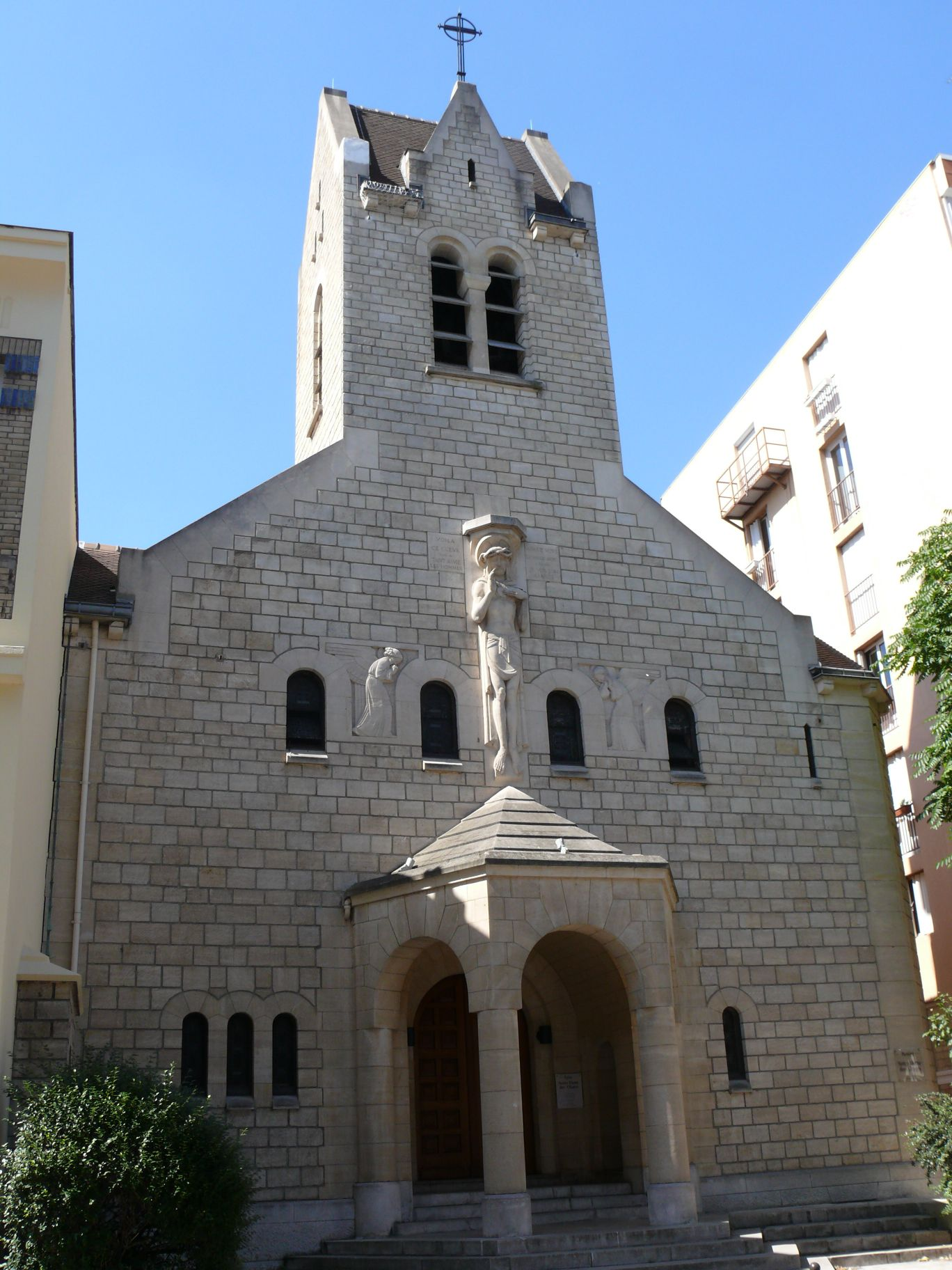
- Notre-Dame des Otages, Paris

Religion
- Affiliation: Catholic Church
- Province: Archdiocese of Paris
- Rite: Roman Rite

Location
- Location: 91 Rue Haxo in the 20th arrondissement of Paris
- Interactive map of Notre-Dame des Otages, Paris

Architecture
- Style: Neo-Gothic
- Groundbreaking: 1936
- Completed: 1938

Notre-Dame-des-Otages (French for 'Our Lady of the Hostages') is a Roman Catholic parish church in the 20th arrondissement of Paris. It was built between 1936 and 1938 to commemorate forty-nine priests and policemen who were taken hostage and executed by the Paris Commune in 1871 during the Massacre in the Rue Haxo.

== History ==
In 1932, the Jesuit Father Henri Diffiné arrived at the Chapel of the Sacred Heart and began a project to build a new church to remember the hostages who died during the Paris Commune. He began raising funds in 1933, and commissioned the architect Julien Barbier (1869–1940) to design the new church. Work began in 1936. The work was slowed by the unstable soil of the site, which required the construction of 33 concrete pilings linked by arches. The church was dedicated 23 October 1938 by Cardinal Jean Verdier, Archbishop of Paris from 1929 until 1940. The Jesuits departed the church in the 1970s, and it became the parish church. In 2009, substantial modifications were made to the interior, including a new altar.

== Name ==
The church was named "Our Lady of the Hostages" to commemorate an event during the Semaine Sanglante, the "Bloody Week" (21–28 May 1871), the final days of the Paris Commune. On 26 May, as the French army advanced to recapture the city, the Commune took 49 hostages: ten priests and clerics, including three Jesuits; 35 policemen and four civilians, whom they proposed to trade for captured Communards. The French army continued its offensive to retake the city. The Commune retaliated; in the presence of the Commune leaders and a large angry crowd, the Communards executed all 49 hostages. In the days that followed, the French army recaptured the city and recovered the bodies of the hostages. Ten to fifteen thousand Communards are recorded to have been killed and buried in mass graves in the city and suburban cemeteries.

A reminder of the hostages can be seen in the courtyard of the church today; the door of a cell from La Roquette Prison, where some of the hostages were held before their summary execution.

== Exterior ==
The facade is in Neo-Romanesque style with rounded arches. It is built of reinforced concrete covered with dressed stone. Since the church was designed for the Society of Jesus or Jesuits, the architecture is full of groups of three elements, representing the Holy Trinity. There are groups of three lancet windows in each section of the nave wall. Over the portal is a sculpture representing the Sacred Heart of Jesus, flanked by angels. The sculptor was Roger de Villiers (1887–1957).

On the courtyard at the rear of the church is the door of a cell at the La Roquette Prison where three of the Jesuit priest hostages were held. The courtyard also has a plaque with the names of all of the hostages.

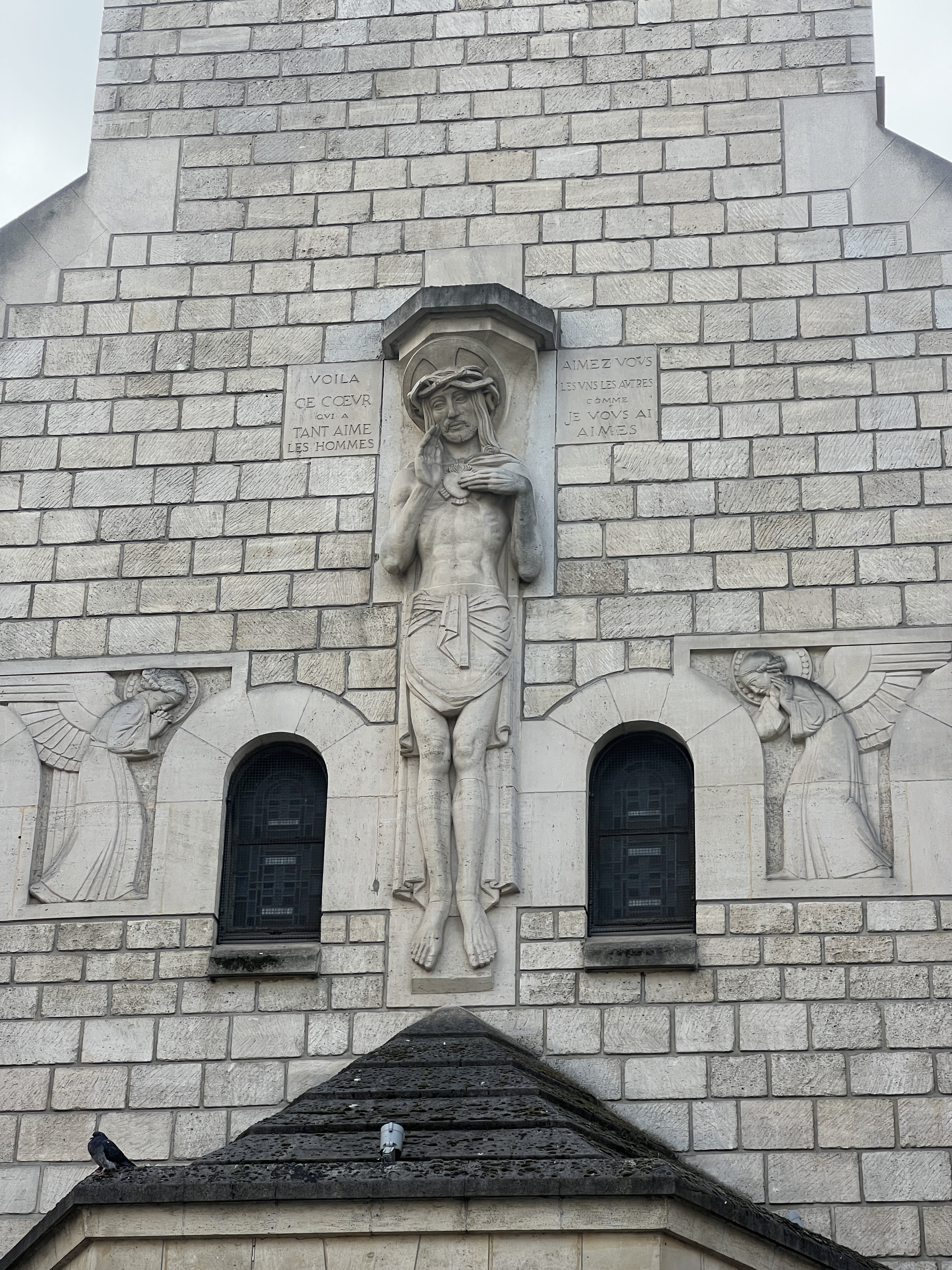
Sculpture of the Sacred Heart of Jesus and Angels over the portal

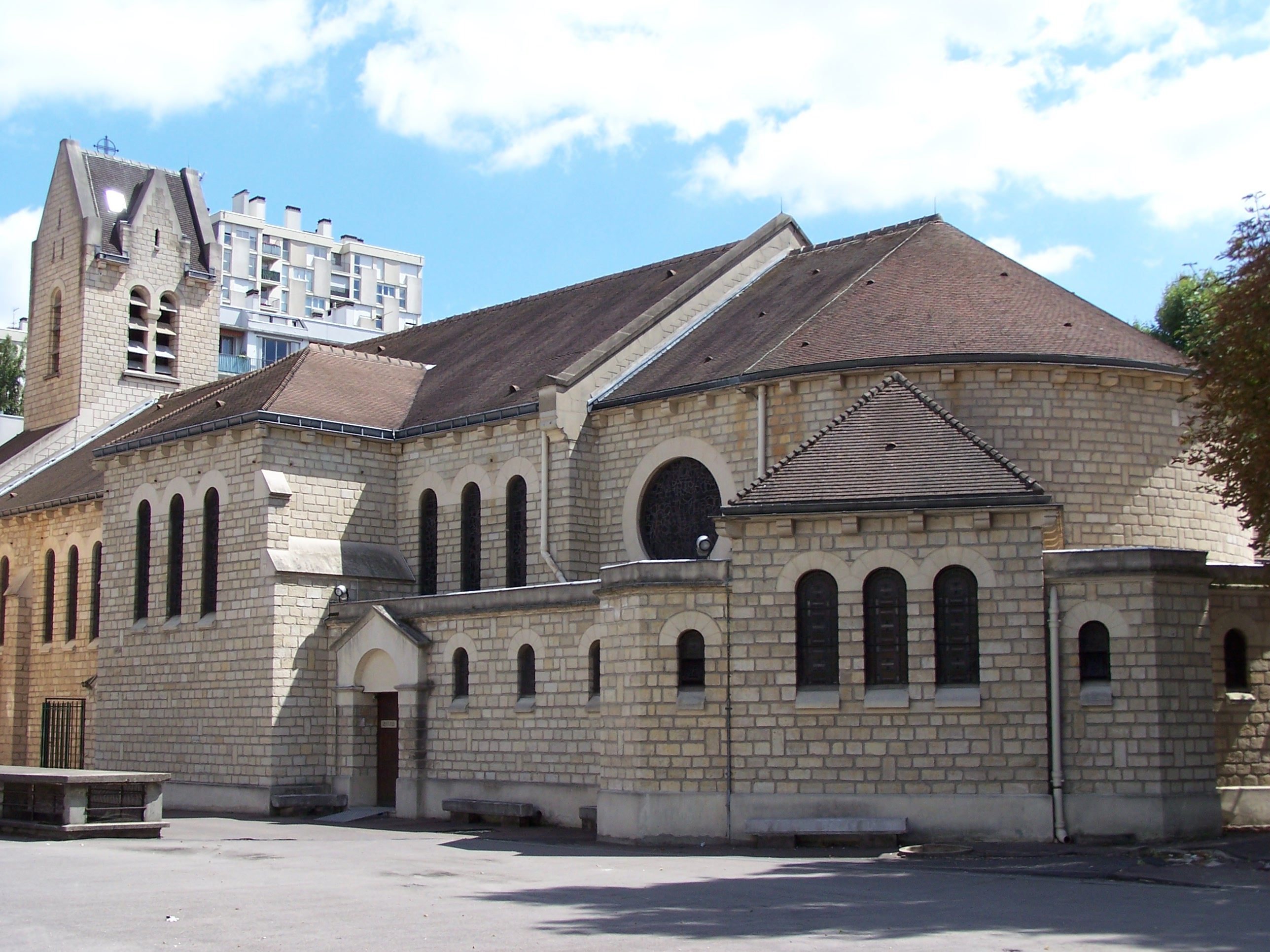
The chevet of the church and courtyard

== Interior ==
The interior of the church is in the Neo-Byzantine style, with Art Deco decoration. The nave and choir have very spare decoration. The ceiling has rounded vaults with no ornament. The pulpit and the confessionals are integrated into the choir walls.

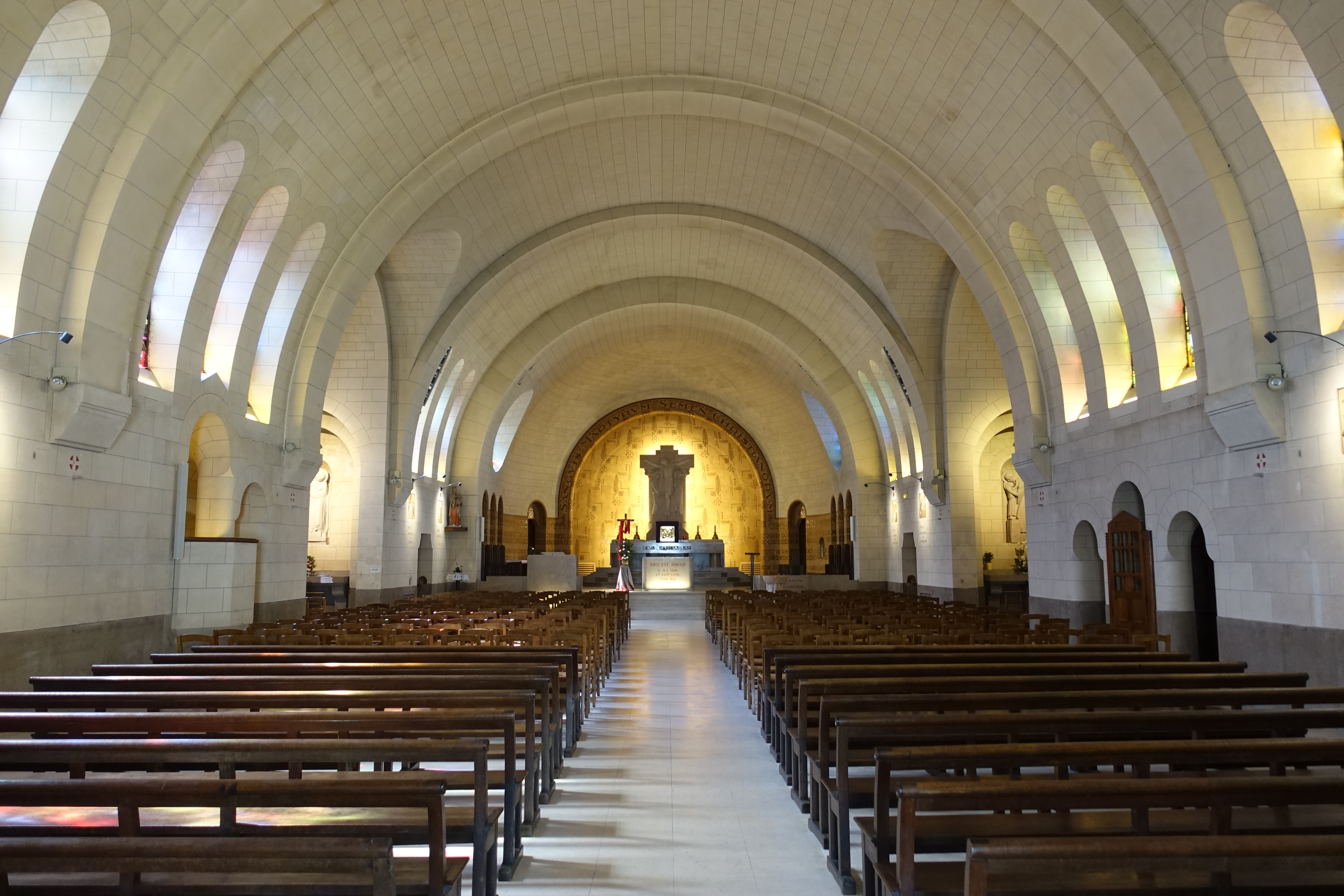
The nave facing the choir

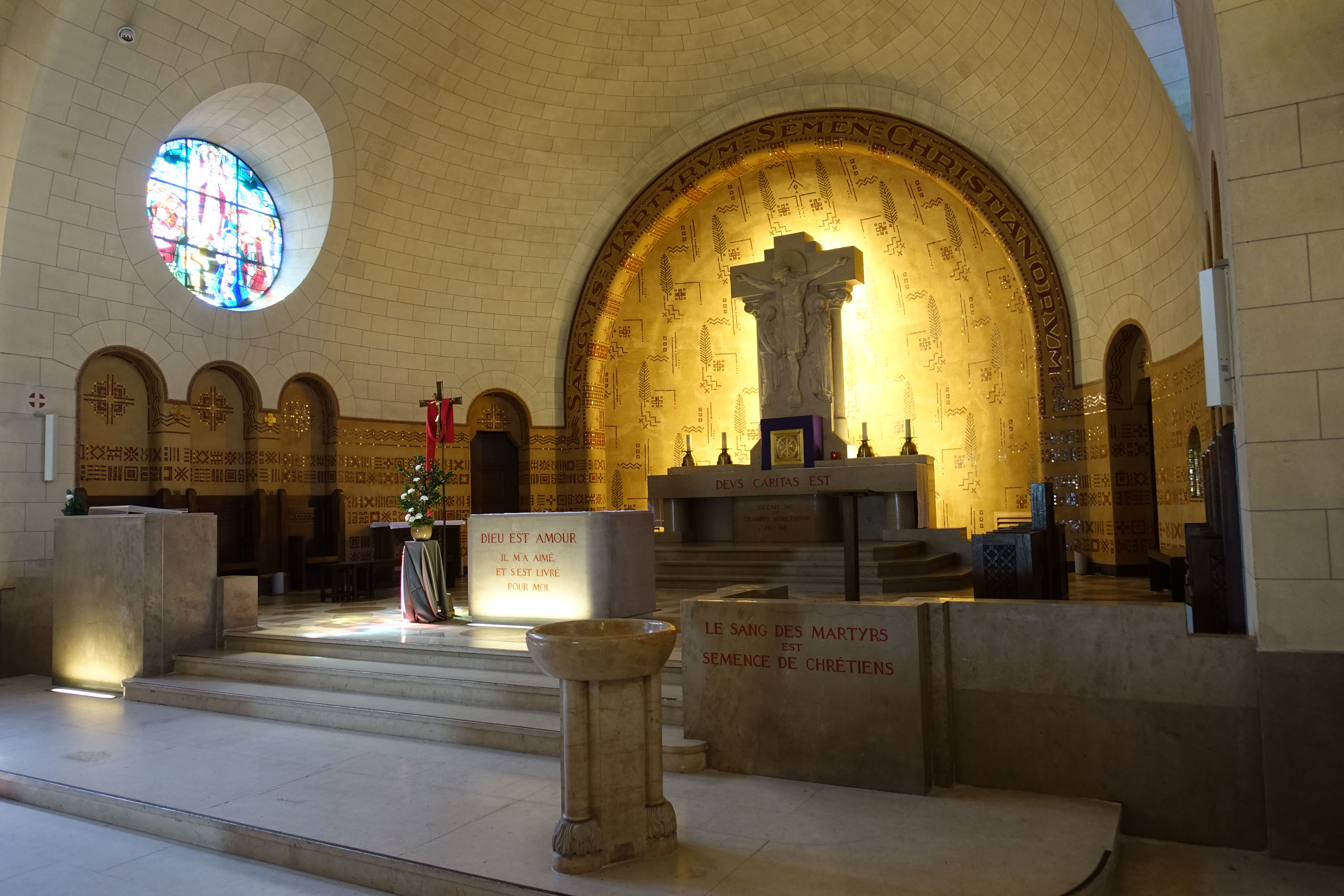
The choir and altar

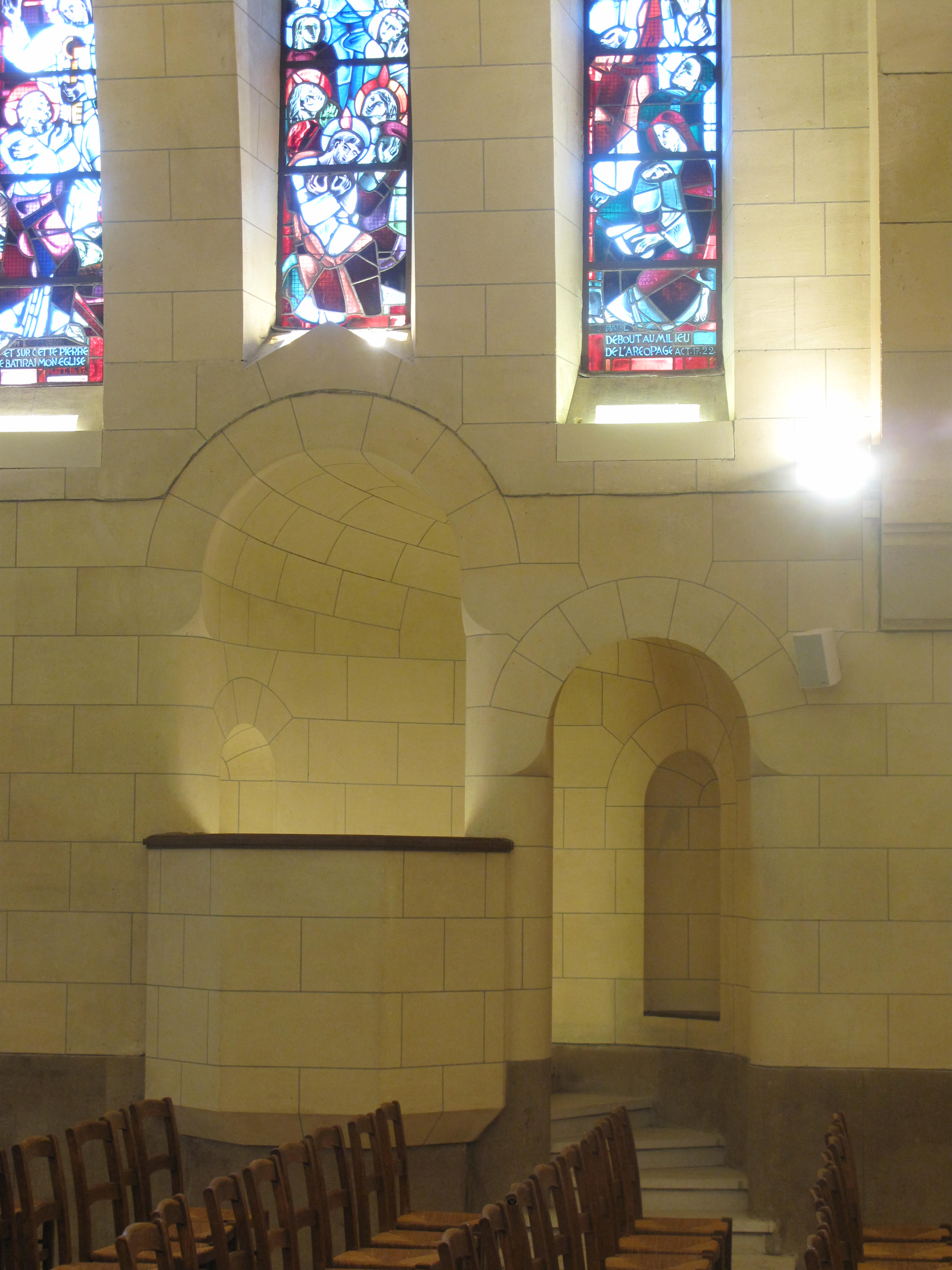
The pulpit, integrated into the wall

== Art and decoration ==
=== Stained glass ===
Since there is very little color in the interior, the stained glass plays a very prominent role. The windows were made from designs by Louis Barillet (1889–1948) that were crafted by Jacques Le Chevallier (1896–1987) and Theodore-Gerard Hanssen (1885–1957). The windows are grouped into sets of three, following the Jesuit tradition, representing the Holy Trinity.

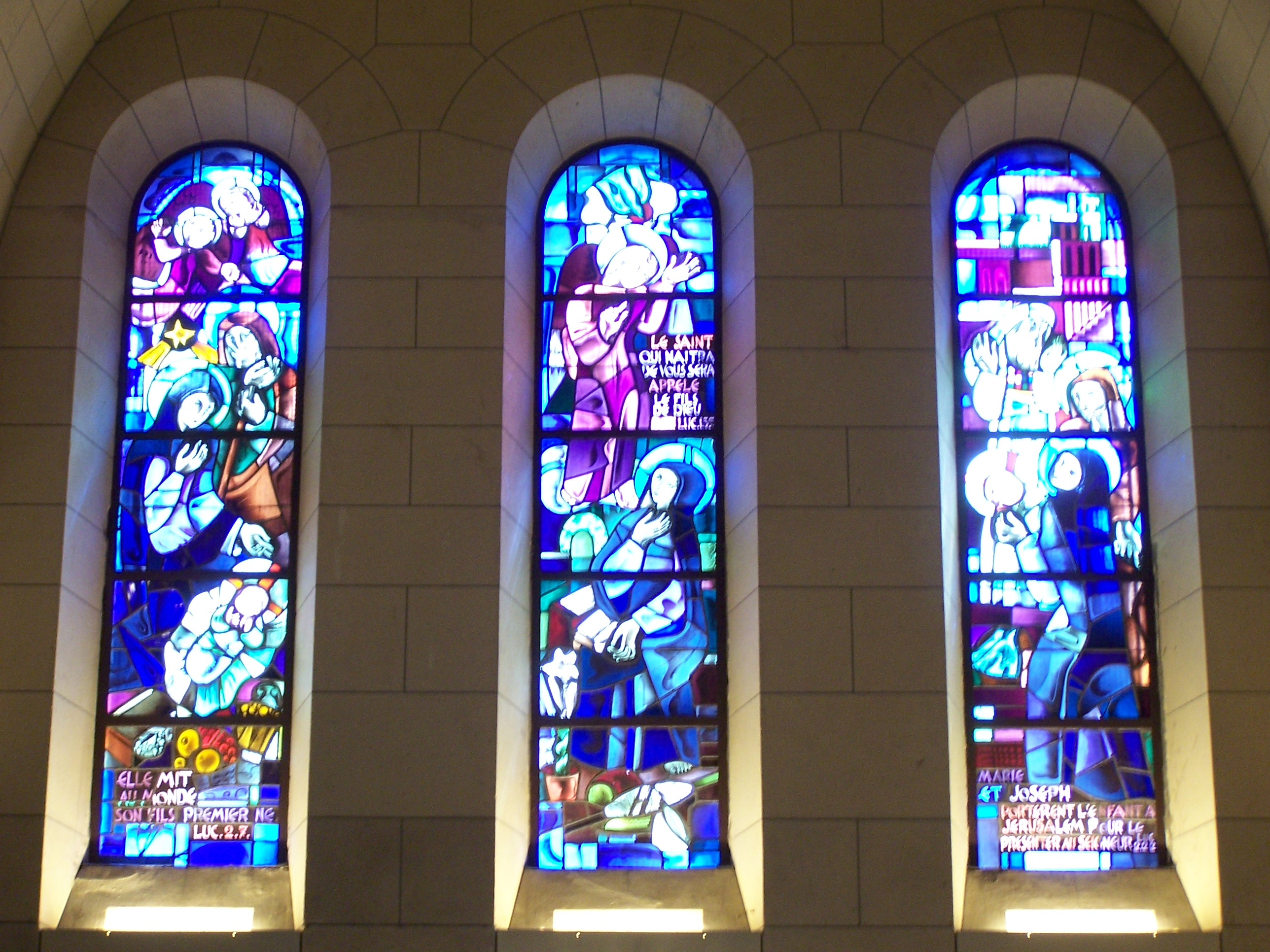
Left transept windows: "The Nativity", "The Annunciation", "Presentation at the Temple"

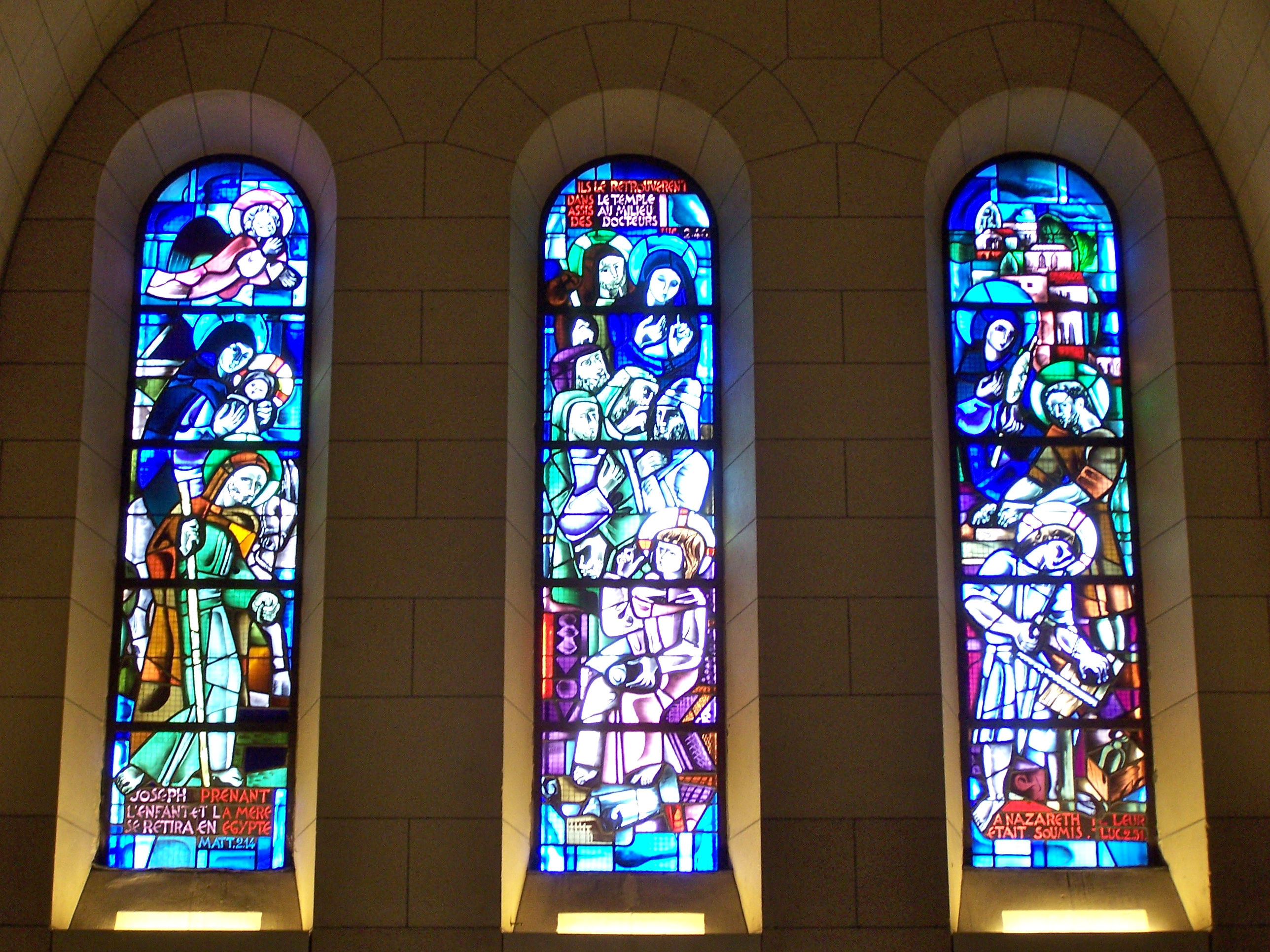
Right transept windows:"Flight to Egypt", "Jesus among the Doctors of Law", "The Holy Family"

=== Sculpture and mosaic ===
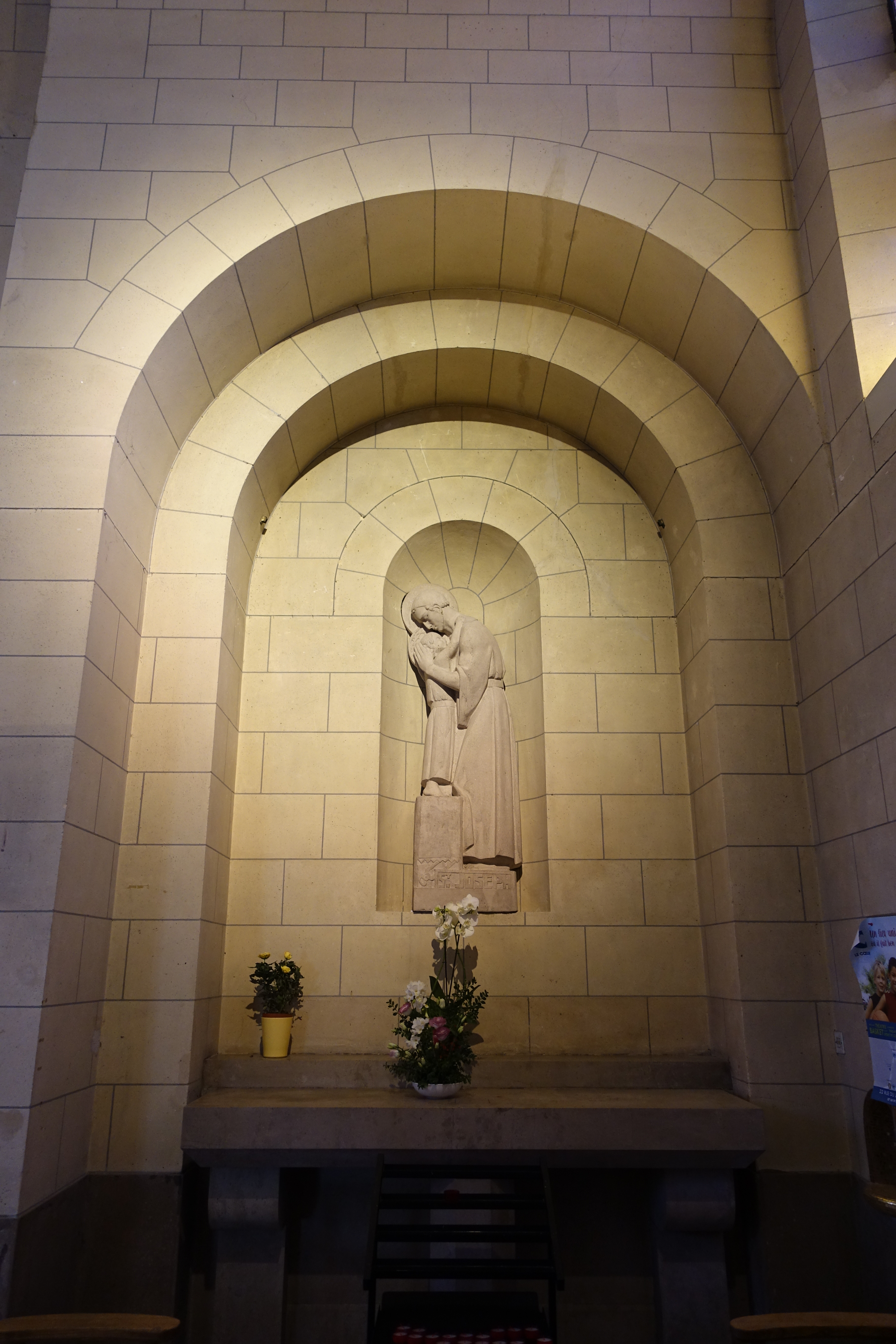
Saint Joseph carrying the infant Jesus, by Yvonne Parvillee (20th c.)

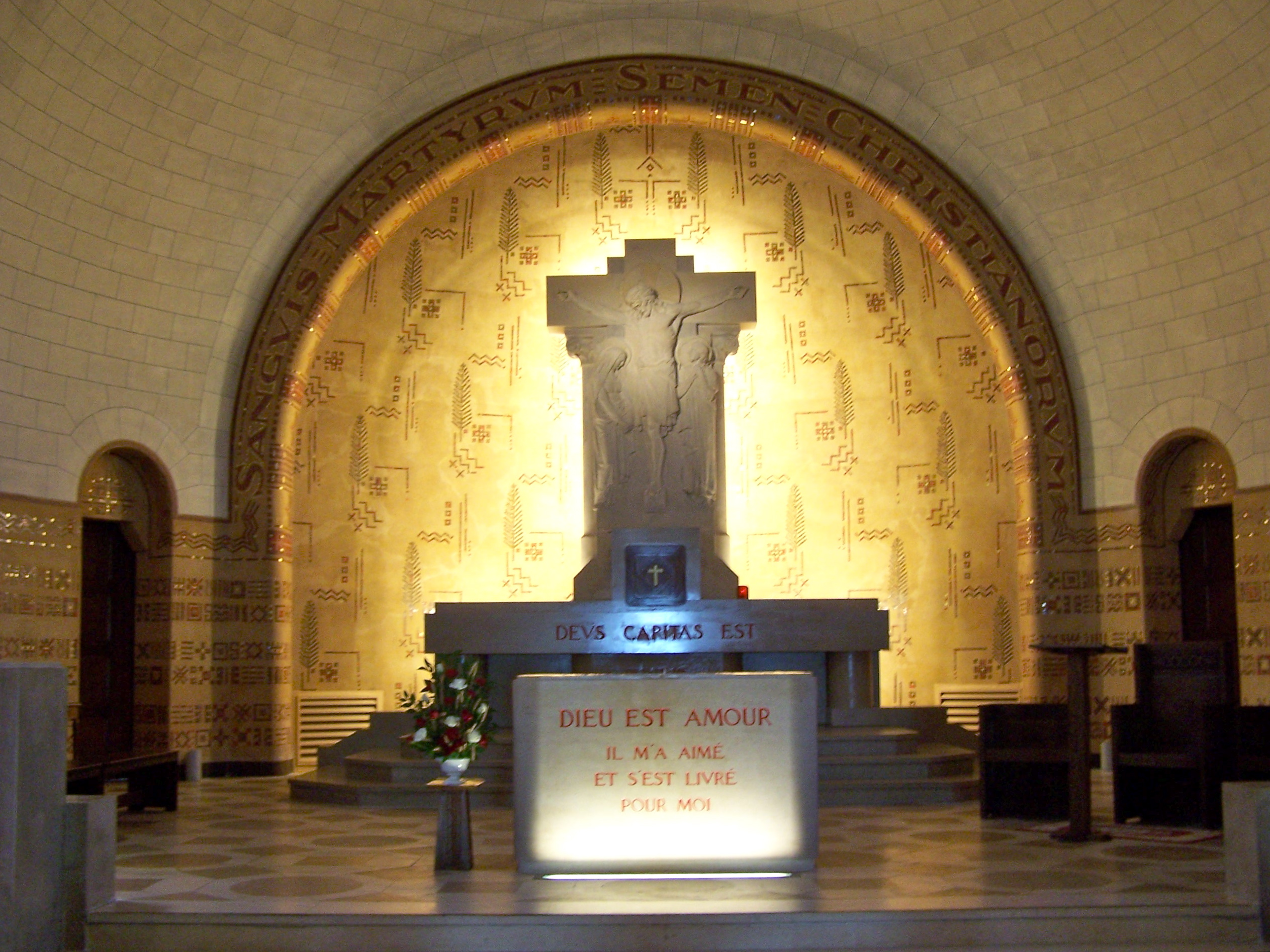
Altar sculpture, "Christ at Calvary" by Jules Déchin (1869–1947)

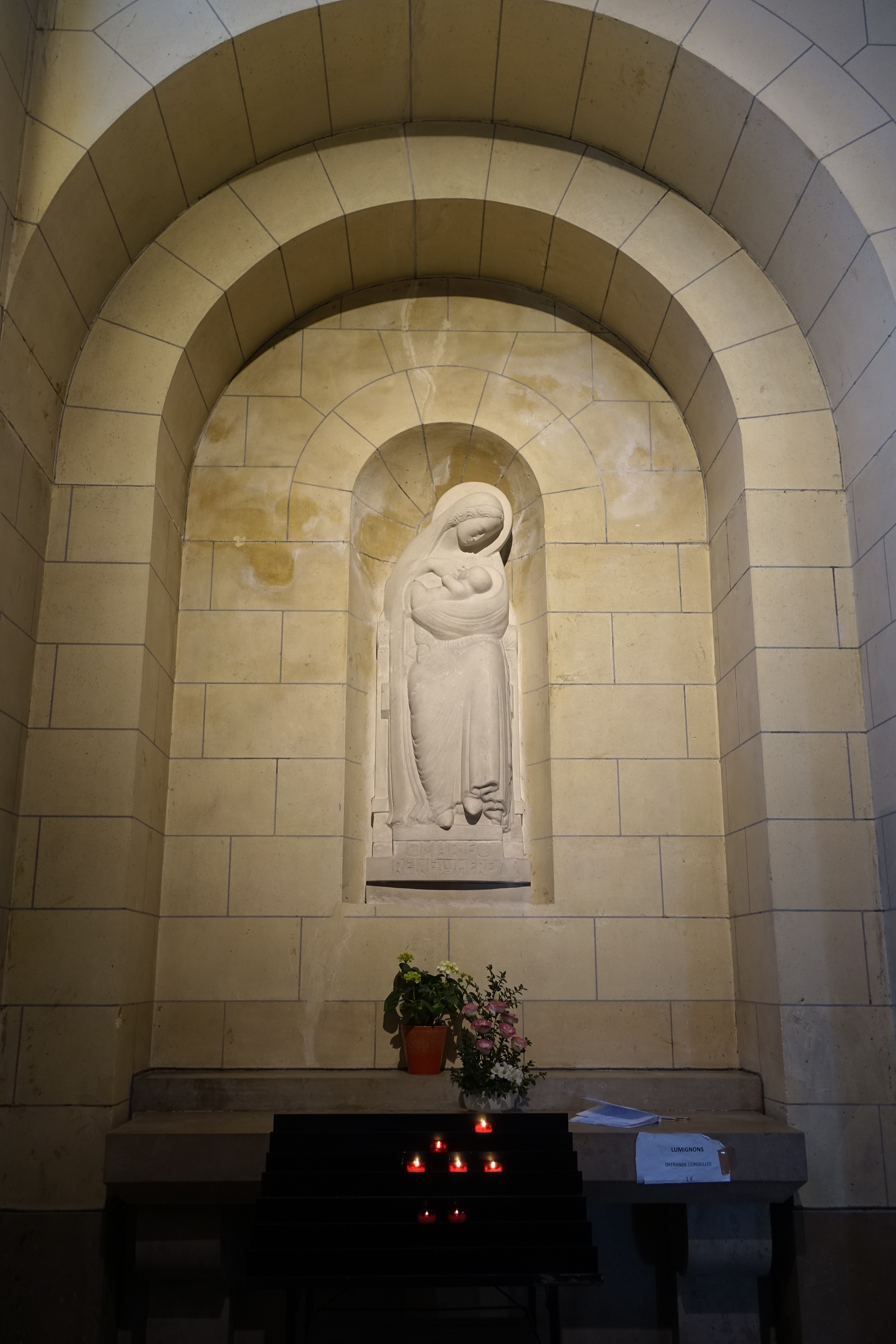
Saint Mary and the Christ Child

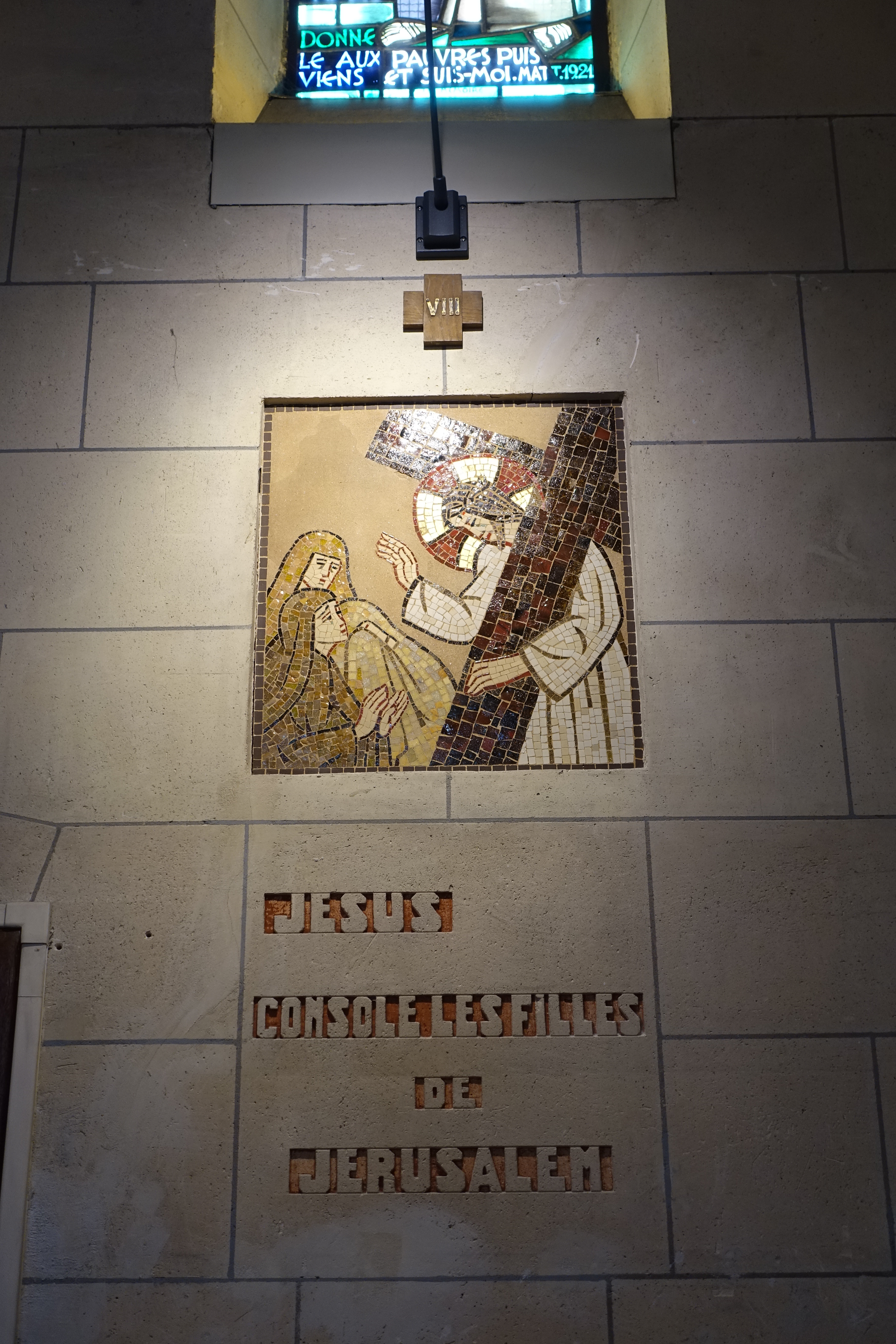
Station of the cross: Christ consoling the women in Jerusalem

A series of Art Deco mosaics along the side aisles depict the Stations of the Cross. They were made by Félix Gaudin based on designs by Louis Mazetier. Mazetier was also the creator of the sculptures on the altar and around the choir.

== Organ ==
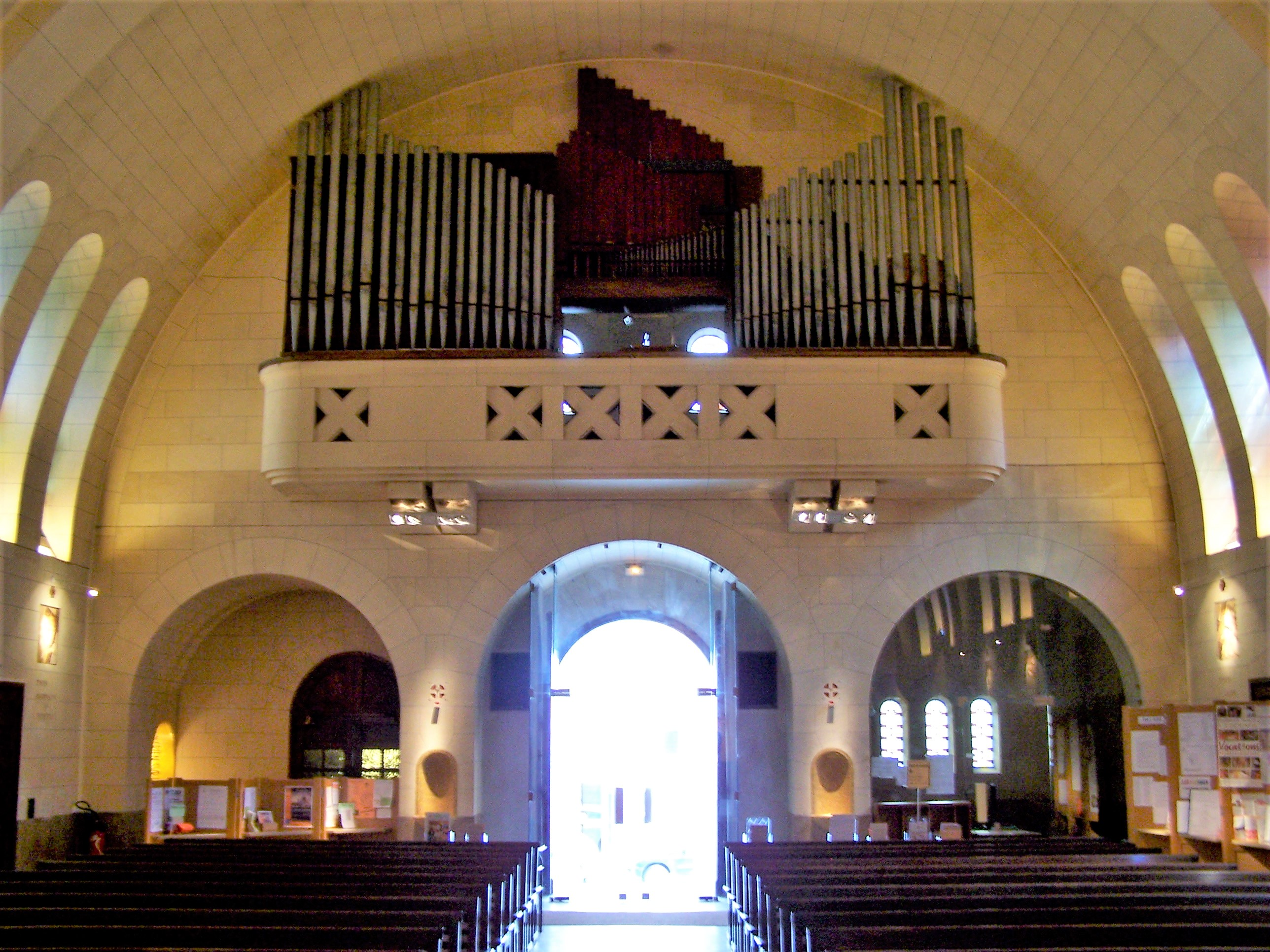
The organ in the tribune

The organ was built in 1956 by Edmond Alexandre Roethinger, using elements recuperated from an older instrument, the former organ of Saint-Séverin, Paris in the 5th arrondissement.
