= Bernhard A. Macek =

Austrian historian and author (born 1975)

Bernhard A. Macek (born 1975 in Vienna, Austria) is an Austrian historian and author.

== Biography ==
Macek, born in Vienna, studied history at the University of Vienna. Since 2001 he has worked at the Imperial Palace Hofburg (Sisi Museum/Imperial Apartments/Silver Collection). In addition, he directs the Department of Viennese Urban History at ÖAB (Austrian Archeology Association). He also works on publications on historical topics, for example about the coronation of Joseph II (Holy Roman Empire) or about the life of Charles I, the last Emperor of Austria.

Macek's lecturing led him to the University of Vienna, to the Pope Benedict XVI Philosophical-Theological University Heiligenkreuz, to the city of Heusenstamm (Germany) on the occasion of the celebrations "250 Years of the Imperial Visit", to the Italian Cultural Institute in Vienna, to Madonna di Campiglio (Italy) for the festival "Mistero dei Monte – Vostre Altezze, etc.

== Publications ==
- Feldmarschall-Leutnant Franz von Holbein-Holbeinsberg. „Directiven“ der Spanischen Hofreitschule. Reitkunst, Militär und Gesellschaft des 19. Jahrhunderts, (= Historica Austria 7), Wien 2008, ISBN 978-3-901515-11-8.
- Die Krönung Josephs II. zum Römischen König in Frankfurt am Main. Logistisches Meisterwerk, zeremonielle Glanzleistung und Kulturgüter für die Ewigkeit, Frankfurt am Main u. a. 2010, ISBN 978-3-631-60849-4, doi:10.3726/978-3-653-04406-5.
- Haydn, Mozart und die Großfürstin. Eine Studie zur Uraufführung der „Russischen Quartette" op. 33 in den Kaiserappartements der Wiener Hofburg, Wien 2012, ISBN 3-901568-72-7.
- Kaiser Karl I. Der letzte Kaiser Österreichs. Ein biografischer Bilderbogen (= Die Reihe Archivbilder), Erfurt 2012, ISBN 978-3-95400-076-0.
- with Renate Holzschuh-Hofer: Die Wiener Hofburg. Die unbekannten Seiten der Kaiserresidenz, Sutton-Verlag, Erfurt 2014, ISBN 978-3-95400-420-1.
- with Rossana Crisci: Francesco Giuseppe I., Testimonianze, MGS Press, Trieste 2016. ISBN 978-88-97271-23-9, (in Italian).
