= Coronations in the Americas =

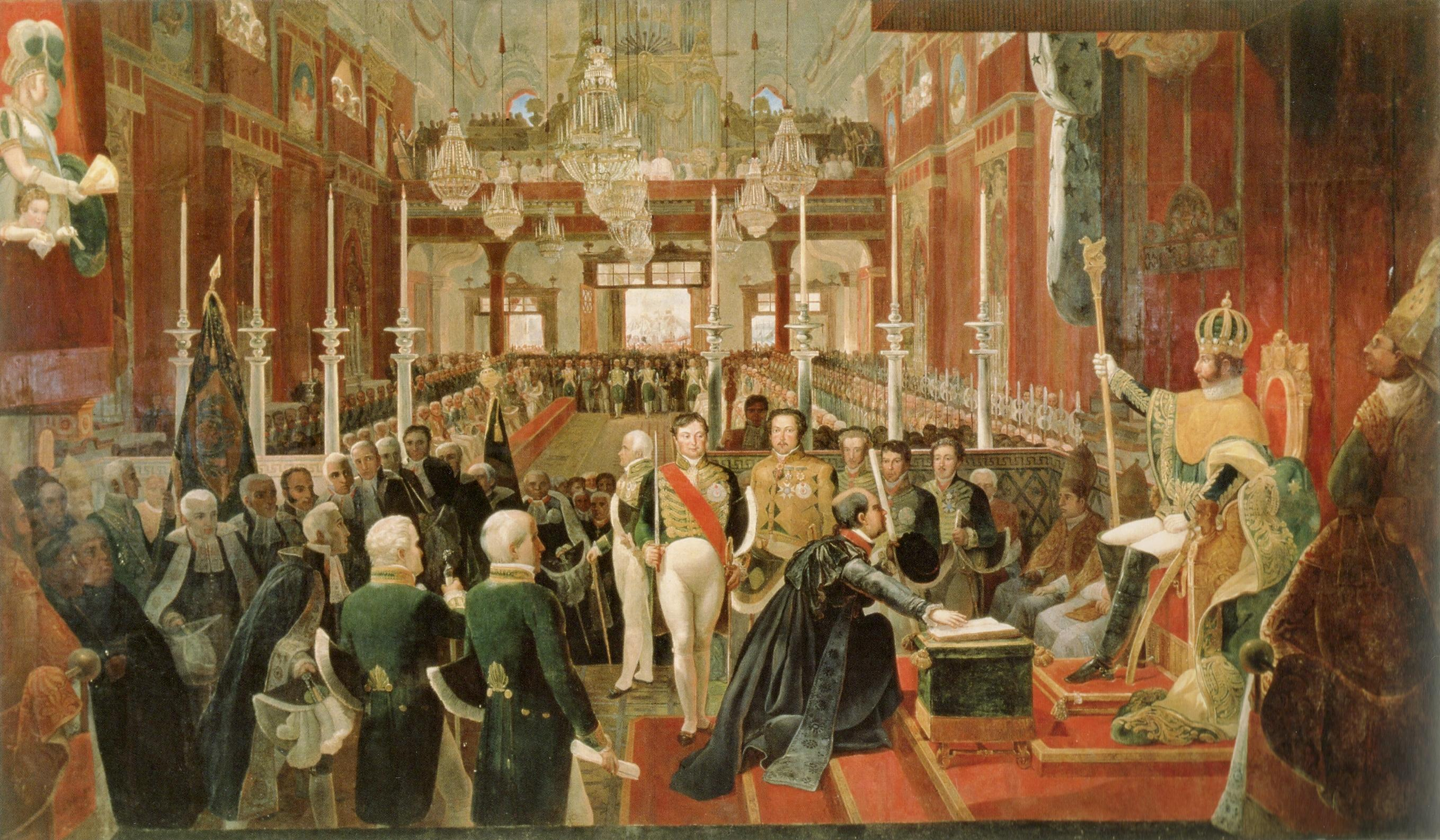
Coronation ceremony of Emperor Pedro I of Brazil

Coronations in the Americas were previously held by multiple countries on both continents, with the majority occurring in Latin America. They were held by endemic constitutional monarchies with their own resident monarch. There are no longer any endemic American monarchies.

== By country ==
=== Brazil ===
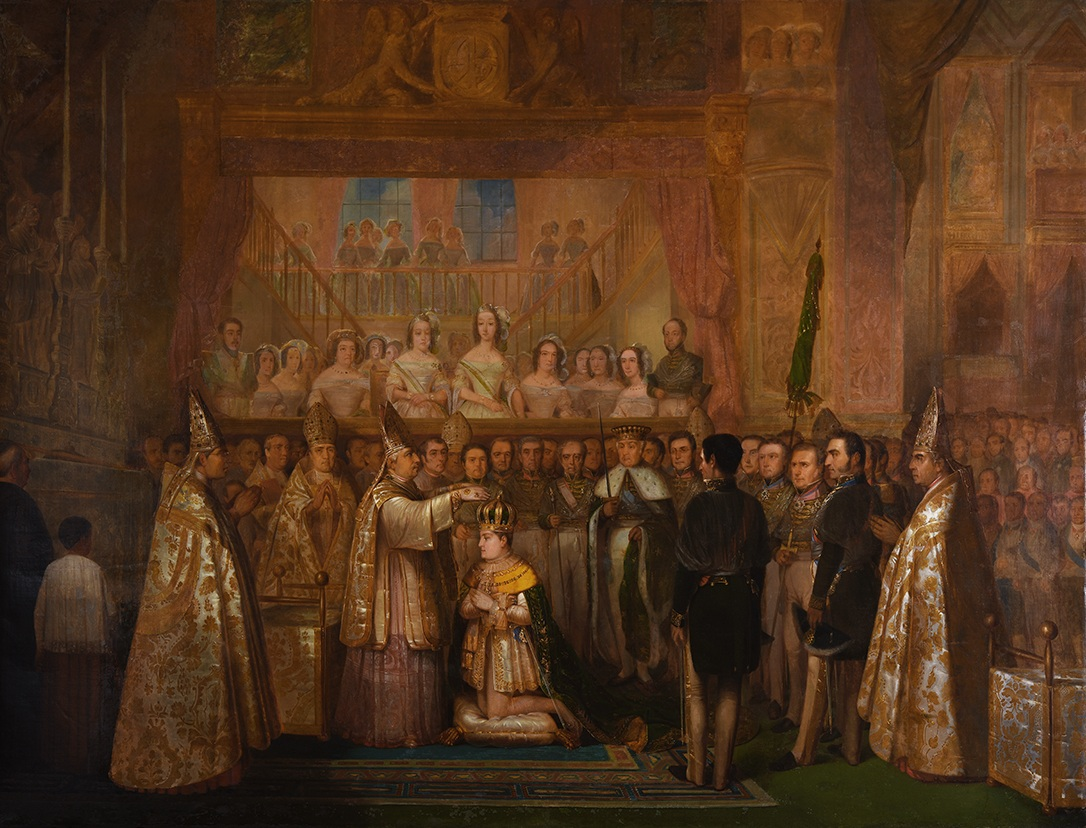
Coronation of Emperor Pedro II of Brazil

Brazilian emperors, of which there were two (Pedro I and Pedro II), were crowned with the Imperial Crown of Brazil in a Catholic Coronation Mass. The constitution required the monarch to have reached their eighteenth birthday before the ceremony could take place. Brazil abolished its monarchy in 1889. Pedro I was crowned on 1 December 1822 and Pedro II was crowned on 18 July 1841. Both ceremonies were held in the Old Cathedral of Rio de Janeiro, which served as the Court's Imperial Chapel.

The coronation of Pedro I was presided over by the then Bishop of Rio de Janeiro and Major Chaplain of the Imperial Chapel. The coronation of Pedro II was presided over by the then Archbishop of São Salvador da Bahia and Primate of Brazil. Pedro II's coronation was a lavish event. In both ceremonies, the coronation rite prescribed in the Roman Pontifical of Pope Benedict XIV, then in force, was used.

=== Haiti ===
Jean-Jacques Dessalines, one of the founding fathers of Haiti, proclaimed himself Emperor Jacques I of Haiti soon after its independence, establishing the First Empire of Haiti. He was crowned on 6 October 1804 in Le Cap but was assassinated two years later. The Kingdom of Haiti was established in 1811 by Henri Christophe, another leader in the Haitian independence struggle. He was crowned King Henry I of Haiti on 2 June 1811, in a lavish ritual presided over by Archbishop Jean-Baptiste-Joseph Brelle of Milot, but committed suicide in 1820. Faustin Soulouque proclaimed himself to be Emperor Faustin I of Haiti in 1849; he was crowned in an extremely elaborate ceremony held in Port-au-Prince on 18 April 1852 but was forced to abdicate in 1859, bringing the Second Empire of Haiti to an end.

=== Mexico ===
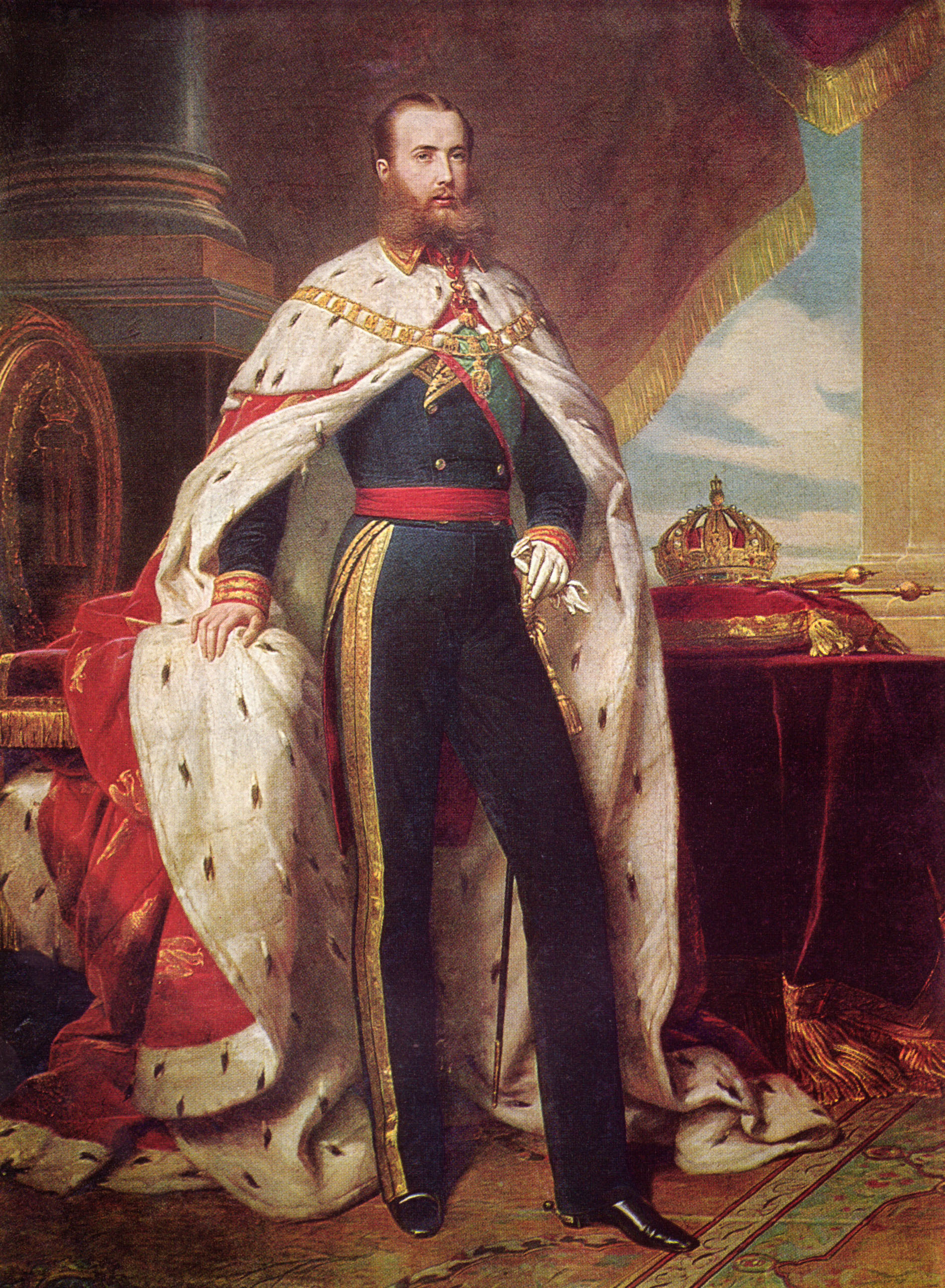
Maximilian I of Mexico by Albert Gräfle, Chapultepec Castle, Mexico City.

Mexico has twice been a monarchy ruled by a Mexican emperor. Agustín I ruled from 1822 to 1823 after the Mexican empire's independence from Spain; he was crowned in a lavish ceremony on 21 July 1822 at the Catedral Metropolitana de Mexico in Mexico City, placing the diadem on his own head in the manner of Napoléon I. Agustín I was overthrown in March 1823, and the Mexican monarchy abolished.

Mexico's second monarch was Maximilian I, a Habsburg archduke who was a descendant of the Spanish monarch Charles I and V, under which New Spain (Mexico) was formed. He was persuaded to take the newly revived Mexican throne in 1864 by Mexican monarchists and Napoléon III of France (whose troops, in conjunction with Mexican conservatives and nobility, had instituted it). His consort was Charlotte of Belgium, or Empress Carlota of Mexico. The second Imperial Crown of Mexico and a matching scepter were manufactured for their coronation at the Catedral Metropolitana in Mexico City amid several celebrations. The Second Mexican Empire lasted for over three years. Maximilian was defeated by Republican forces led by Mexican President Benito Juárez and aided by the U.S. He was executed in 1867, along with two of his top Mexican generals, bringing the empire to an end.

=== United States ===
James Strang, a would-be successor to Joseph Smith, in the leadership of the Latter Day Saint movement from 1844 to 1856, openly established an ecclesiastical monarchy on Beaver Island, Michigan, in 1850. On 8 July of that year, he staged an elaborate coronation ceremony complete with a throne, wooden sceptre, breastplate and a crown described by one observer as "a shiny metal ring with a cluster of glass stars in the front". "King Strang" reigned over his followers until 16 June 1856, when he was assassinated by two disgruntled subjects. His people were driven from the island, and Strang's 'kingdom'—together with most of his royal regalia—vanished.

For coronations in the pre-annexation Hawaiian Kingdom, see Coronations in Oceania.

Some observers compare the American presidential inauguration to a coronation, with the American constitutional requirement for a presidential oath congruent to the oaths required of the world's monarchs. Some historians and comparative government experts indicate that the former stems directly from the latter. The pomp and pageantry of the modern event is comparable in some ways to monarchical coronations.

== See also ==
- Monarchies in the Americas
