= The Source (Ingres) =

Painting by Jean-Auguste-Dominique Ingres

- La Source
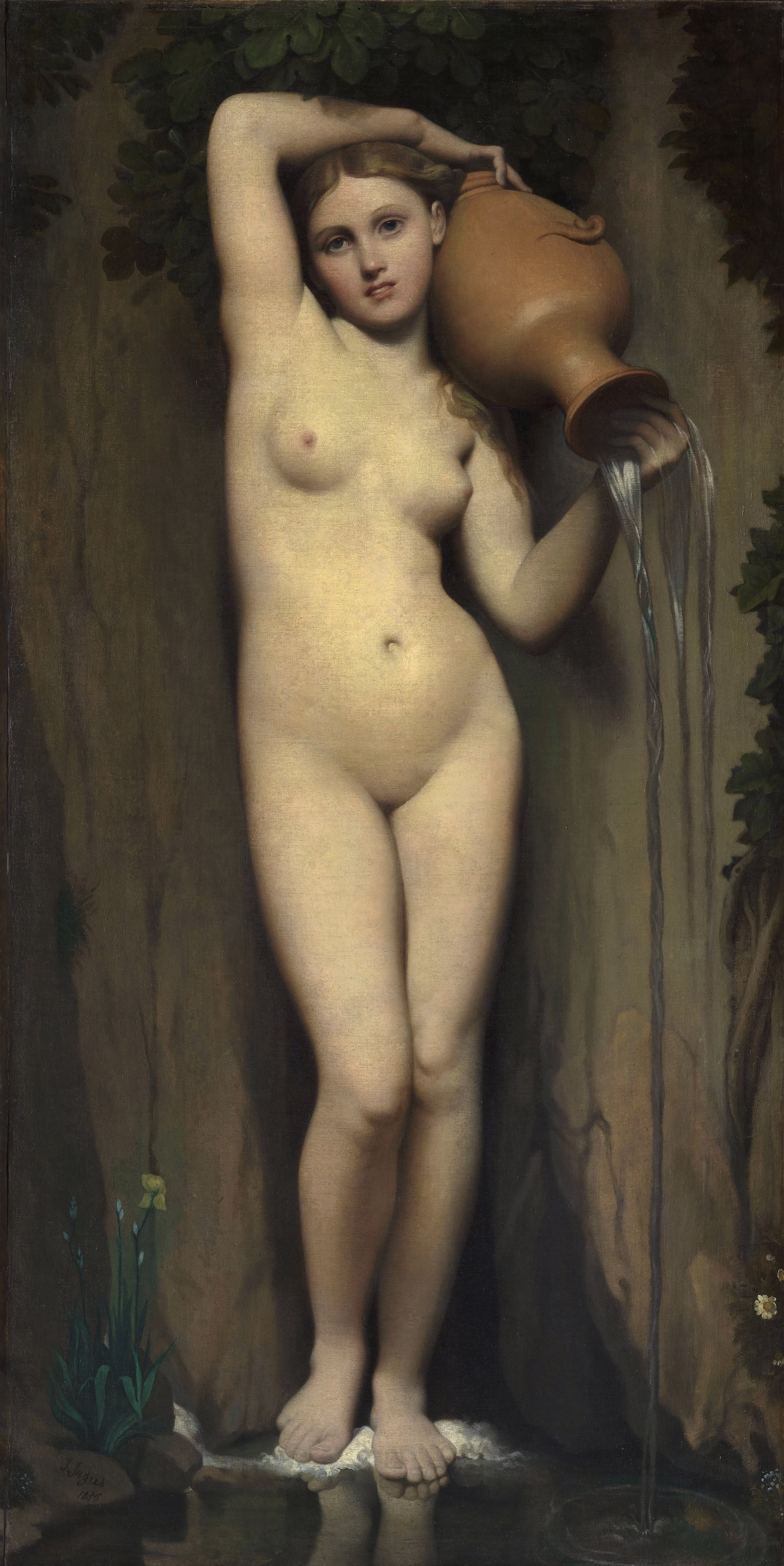
- Artist: Jean-Auguste-Dominique Ingres, Alexandre Desgoffe, Paul Balze
- Year: 1856
- Medium: canvas, oil paint
- Dimensions: 163 cm (64 in) × 80 cm (31 in)
- Location: Musée d'Orsay, Paris, France
- Collection: Department of Paintings of the Louvre, Musée d'Orsay
- Accession no.: RF 219
- Identifiers: Joconde work ID: 000PE001514; Bildindex der Kunst und Architektur ID: 20364924

The Source (French: La Source, meaning "The Water Source or The Spring") is an oil painting on canvas by French neoclassical painter Jean-Auguste-Dominique Ingres. The work was begun in Florence around 1820 and not completed until 1856, in Paris. When Ingres completed The Source, he was seventy-six years old, already famous, and president of the École des Beaux-Arts. The pose of the nude may be compared with that of another by Ingres, the Venus Anadyomene (1848), and is a reimagination of the Aphrodite of Cnidus or Venus Pudica. Two of Ingres' students, painters Paul Balze and Alexandre Desgoffe, helped to create the background and water jar.

== Description ==
The painting depicts a nude woman standing upright between an opening in the rocks and holding in her hands a pitcher, from which water flows. She thus represents a water source or spring, for which source is the normal French word, and which, in classical literature, is sacred to the Muses and a source of poetic inspiration. She stands between two flowers, with their "vulnerability to males who wish to pluck them", and is framed by ivy, plant of Dionysus the god of disorder, regeneration, and ecstasy. The water she pours out separates her from the viewer, as rivers mark boundaries of which the crossing is symbolically important.

== Theme ==
Art historians Frances Fowle and Richard Thomson suggest that there is a "symbolic unity of woman and nature" in The Source, where the flowering plants and water serve as a background which Ingres fills with woman's "secondary attributes".

== Reception ==
The first exhibition of The Source was in 1856, the year it was completed. The painting was received enthusiastically. Duchâtel acquired the painting in 1857 for a sum of 25,000 francs. The state assumed title to the painting in 1878 and it passed to the Musée du Louvre. In 1986 it was transferred to the Musée d'Orsay. The painting has been frequently exhibited and widely published.

Haldane Macfall in A History of Painting: The French Genius describes The Source as Ingres' "superb nude by which he is chiefly known". Kenneth Clark in his book Feminine Beauty observed how The Source has been described as "the most beautiful figure in French painting." Walter Friedländer in David to Delacroix referred to The Source simply as the most famous of Ingres' paintings.

The model for the painting was the young daughter of Ingres' concierge. In his Confessions of a Young Man, Irish novelist George Moore wrote, with relation to the morality of artistic production, "What care I that the virtue of some sixteen-year-old maid was the price for Ingres' La Source? That the model died of drink and disease in the hospital is nothing when compared with the essential that I should have La Source, that exquisite dream of innocence."

== See also ==
- List of paintings by Jean-Auguste-Dominique Ingres
