= The Illness of Antiochus =

Painting by Jean-Auguste-Dominique Ingres

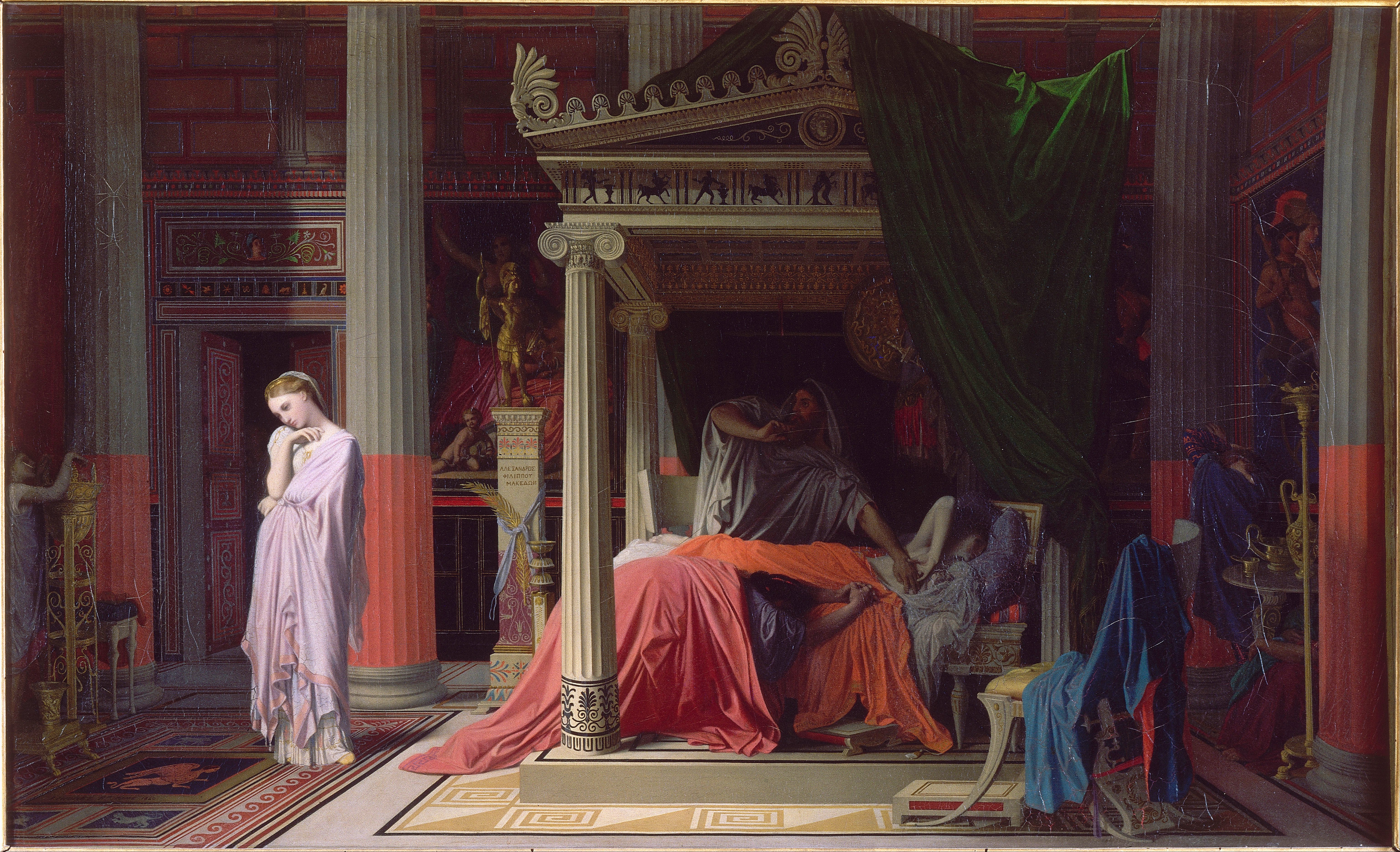
The Illness of Antiochus (1840) by Ingres

The Sickness of Antiochus or Stratonice and Antiochus is an 1840 painting by the French artist Jean-Auguste-Dominique Ingres. It is now in the Musée Condé in Chantilly.

== Description ==
The scene is one described in Plutarch's Life of Demetrius and also attested in the Bibliotheca historica of Diodorus Siculus, Lucian, Appian and Valerius Maximus. Antiochus was the son of Seleucus I Nicator. He fell in love with his father's new wife Stratonice of Syria, but kept this a secret despite falling mortally ill because of it. The doctor Erasistratus discovered the cause of Antiochus' sickness, since he became agitated and his heartbeat quickened when Stratonice entered the room. His father is thus shown collapsed at the foot of the bed.

== History ==
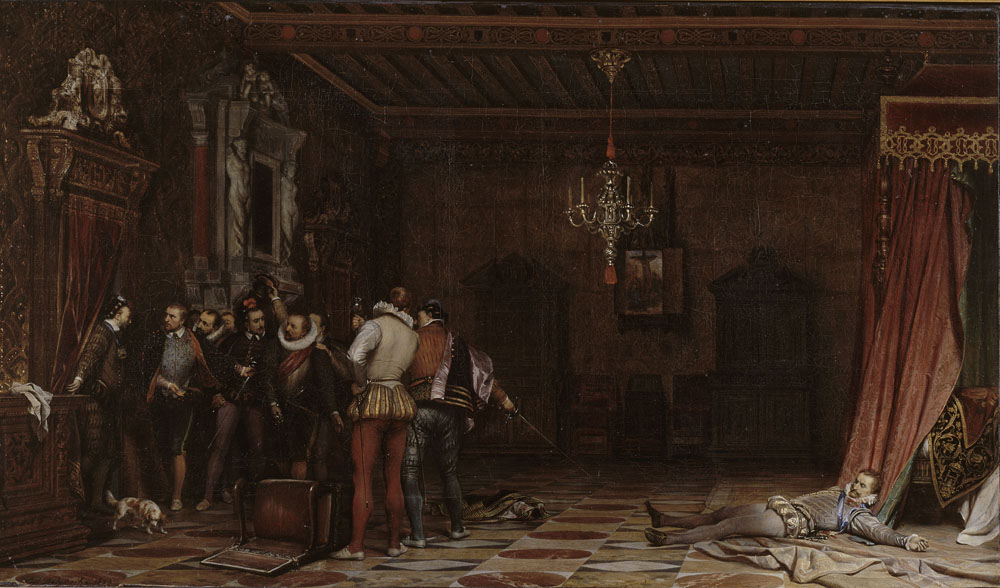
The Assassination of the Duke of Guise by Paul Delaroche, 1834, Musée Condé

In 1834 Prince Ferdinand Philippe, Duke of Orléans commissioned a painting from Ingres to act as a pendant to Paul Delaroche's 1834 The Assassination of the Duke of Guise (now also in the musée Condé). That same year Ingres left for Rome to take up his post as director of the French Academy. This delayed work on the commission, which began with a c.1838 sketch (now in the Cleveland Museum of Art). According to Lady Eglé Charlemont, she served as the model for Stratonice, Ingres' wife (Madeleine Chapelle) as the doctor, Hippolyte Flandrin for Antiochus' arms, and Ingres himself for Seleucus.

The painting was completed in Rome in 1840, with help from assistants: Victor Baltard, then studying architecture at the Academy, provided drawings for two of Ingres' pupils, Paul and Raymond Balze, to use in painting part of the architectural setting. The Duke of Orléans was satisfied with the work and paid Ingres 6000 francs and commissioned a portrait from him. The painting was exhibited in the gallery at the Palais-Royal and was inherited by the Duke of Orléans' widow Hélène de Mecklembourg-Schwerin on his death in 1842.

After the 1848 Revolution, the painting was sold in Paris in 1852, when it was acquired by the Demidoff family for 63,000 francs. It was sold again in Paris in 1863, where it was bought for 93,000 francs by Édouard Bocher, acting as intermediary for the Duke of Orléans' brother the Duke of Aumale, then in exile in London. Aumale exhibited it in the Salle de Tribune of his Château de Chantilly, where it still is.

== Influences ==
Ingres' teacher Jacques-Louis David had also painted the subject, in Erasistratus Discovering the Cause of Antiochus' Disease, the painting which won him the Prix de Rome in 1774. Ingres had made several drawings after David's painting, the earliest dating to 1807.

Another source may have been music and opera, since a lyre is shown in the foreground. The Orchestre du Capitole de Toulouse produced Étienne-Nicolas Méhul's opera Stratonice several times whilst Ingres was a violinist with them. The painting shows the moment of the heroine's solo from Méhul's opera. The Assassination of the Duke of Guise was also based on an opera, Giacomo Meyerbeer's Les Huguenots.

The decor and dress are partly inspired by ancient models, with Stratonice in particular, very closely influenced by Roman sculpture. The bed is inspired by a 4th-century BC naiskos or funerary monument shown on a vase discovered at Canosa and published in 1816.

== Sketches and copies ==
Ingres produced at least four other versions of this subject:

- a large sketch, painted between 1807 and 1825. His pupil Amaury-Duval saw the painting in his master's studio at that date. It disappeared after the sale of Ingres' studio in 1867. It was much larger than the other versions (155 × 190 cm)
- an 1834 sketch for the Chantilly version, now in the Cleveland Museum of Art (48 × 64 cm)
- an 1860 copy of the Chantilly example, on paper mounted on canvas, with several changes, now in the Schauensee collection in Philadelphia (35 × 46 cm)
- an 1866 copy, produced with help from Raymond Balze, reversing the composition and with several changes, now in the Musée Fabre, Montpellier. (61 × 92 cm).
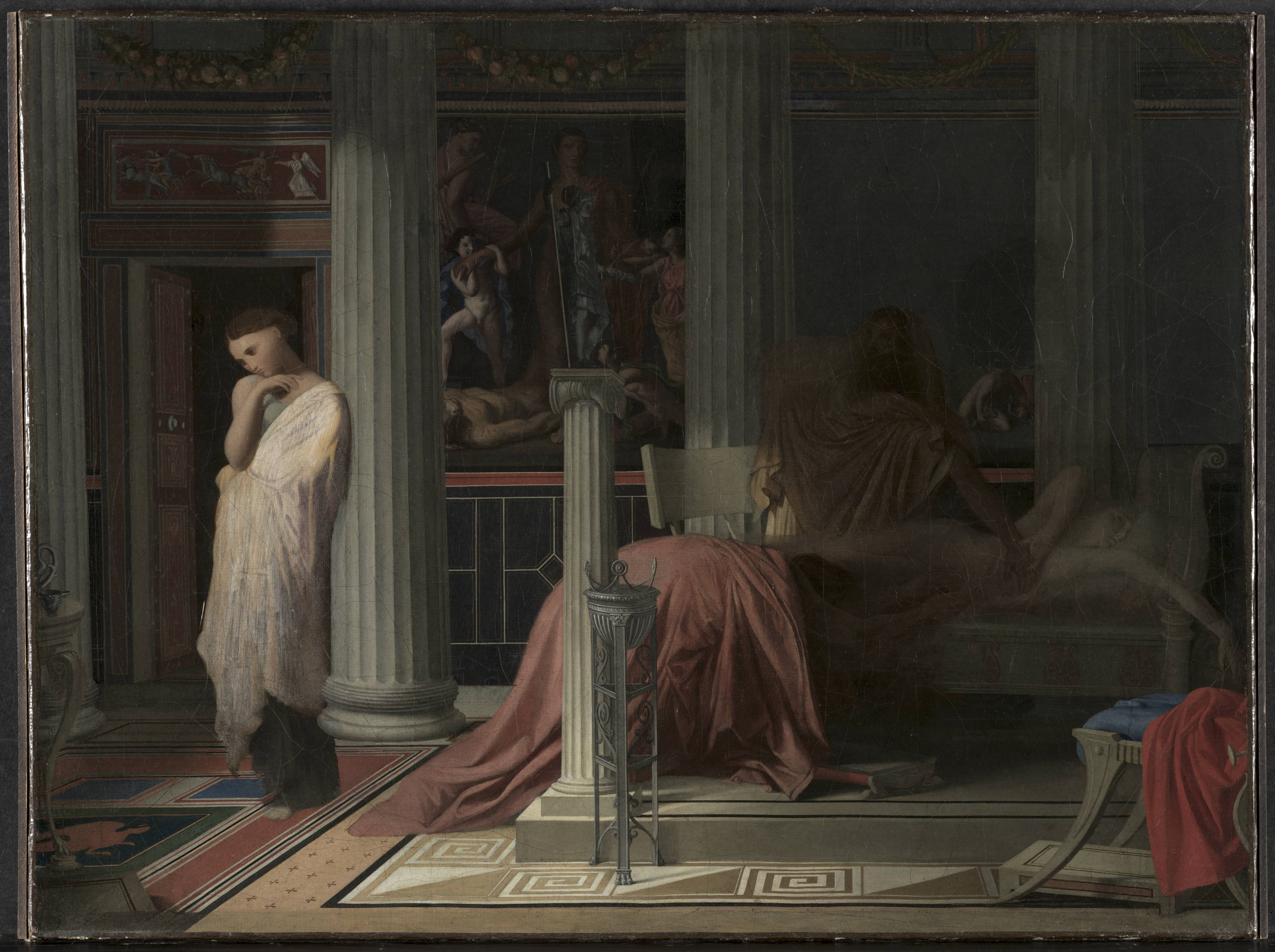
Sketch, Cleveland Museum of Art

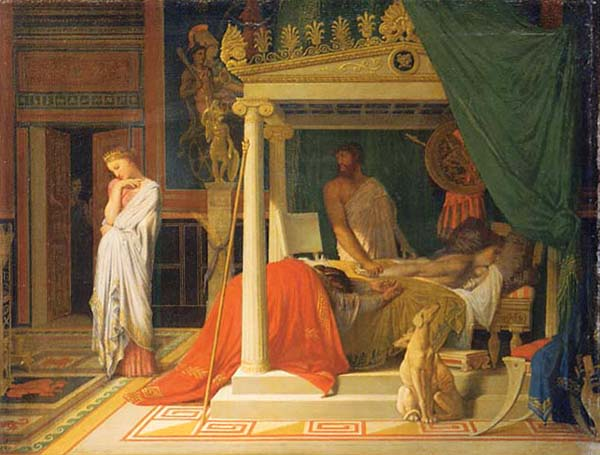
Copy, Philadelphia

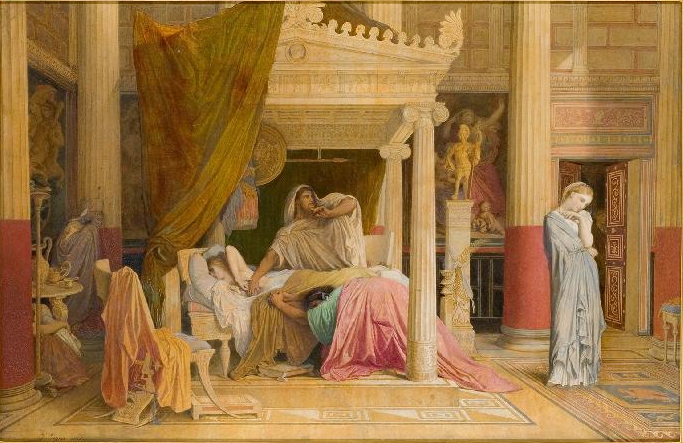
Copy, Musée Fabre

== See also ==
- List of paintings by Jean-Auguste-Dominique Ingres
