= Raymond Balze =

French painter (1818–1909)

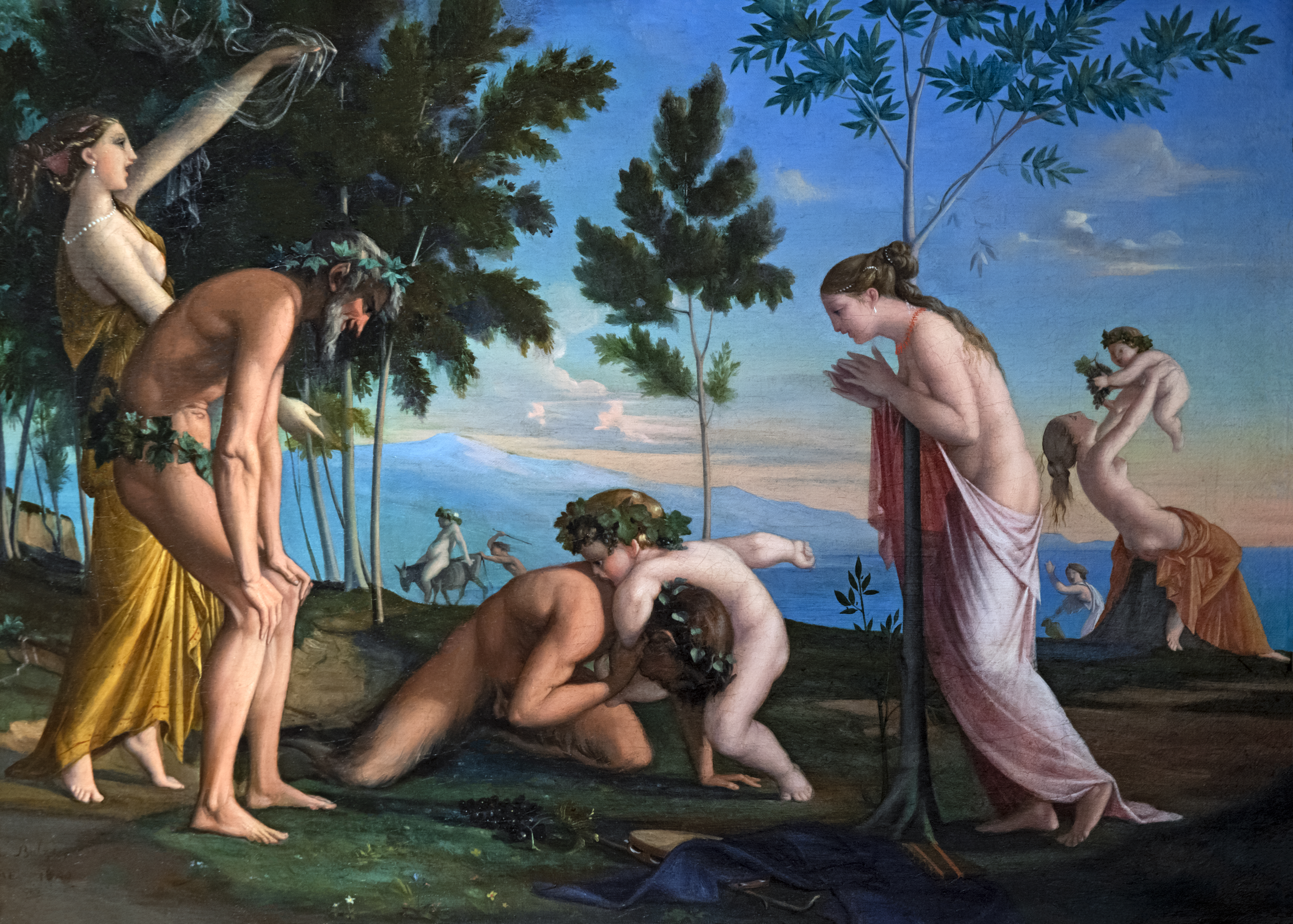
The Childhood of Bacchus, 1840, Ingres-Bourdelle Museum

Jean-Antoine-Raymond Balze (4 May 1818 – 26 February 1909) was a French painter and art copyist.

== Life ==
He was born in Rome, the son of Joseph Balze (1781–1847), grand chamberlain to Charles IV of Spain during the latter's exile in Rome between 1811 and 1819. His elder brother Paul Balze was also active as an artist. During his stay in Rome, Joseph Balze met the painter Jean Auguste Dominique Ingres and commissioned several works from him after 1814.

Raymond entered the École des Beaux-Arts de Paris on 6 October 1832, becoming copyist to the Louvre Museum. By now Ingres was director of the French Academy in Rome, from which he requested that Paul and Raymond be sent to copy the 1519 Vatican loggias by Raphael. These 52 copies were exhibited in 1840 in the chapel of the école des beaux-arts in Paris. In 1843, to reply to a request by Ingres to find a "monumental home", Félix Duban proposed placing them on the first floor galleries in the Palais des Études. These copies were placed in the gallery vaults between 1854 and 1855 by the decorative painters Charles Chauvin and Camille-Auguste Gastine.

The brothers' other collaborations included the 1855 copy of Ingres' The Apotheosis of Homer for one of the stairways in the Louvre, the 1875–1881 restoration of the Francesco Primaticcio frescoes in the abbot's chapel in Chaalis Abbey, and the 1891 design for a mosaic after Raphael showing The Vision of Ezekiel for the facade of Saint-Jacques de Montauban church in Montauban.

Raymond was also attached to the Mauvernay stained-glass studio at Saint-Galmier (Loire). He took part in the 1848 competition and was made a first level laureate. He was commissioned to take part in the decoration of the Hôtel de ville de Paris by Ingres. He also produced religious works, such as The Charity of Saint Elisabeth of Hungary (1866, musée des Beaux-Arts de Lyon) and The Martyrdom of Saint Catherine (1866, église sainte Catherine, Lille).

Raymond Balze died in Paris on 26 February 1909.

== Gallery ==
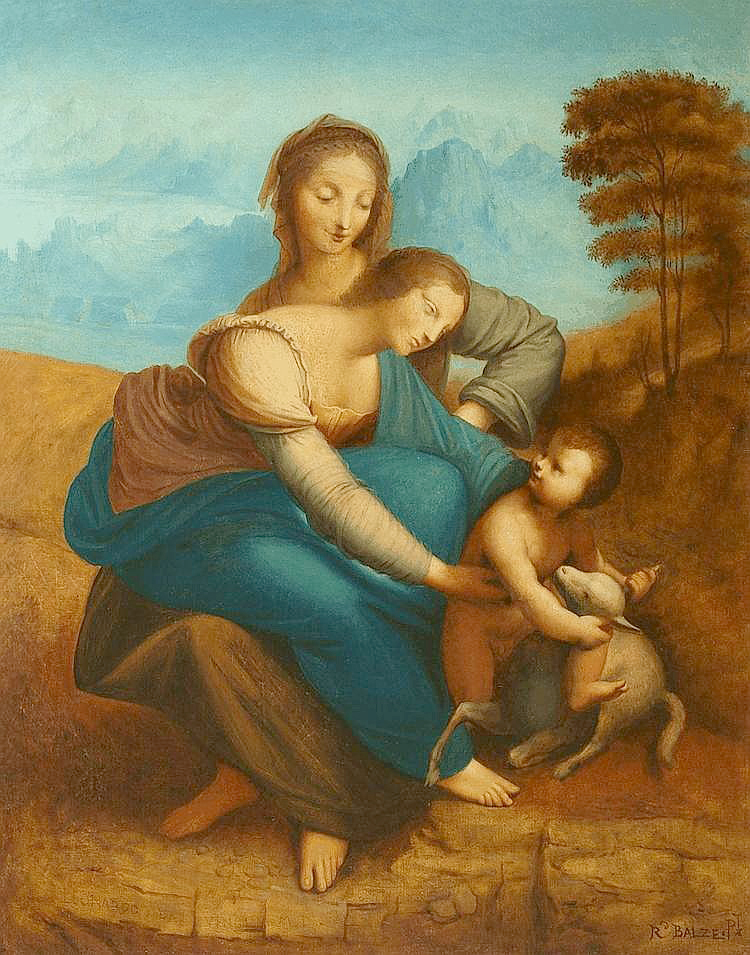
The Virgin and Child with Saint Anne

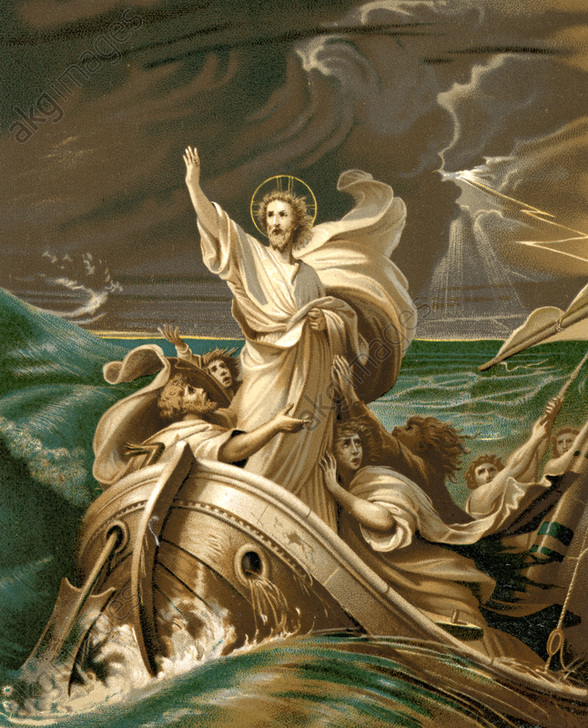
Christ Calming the Storm, 1848

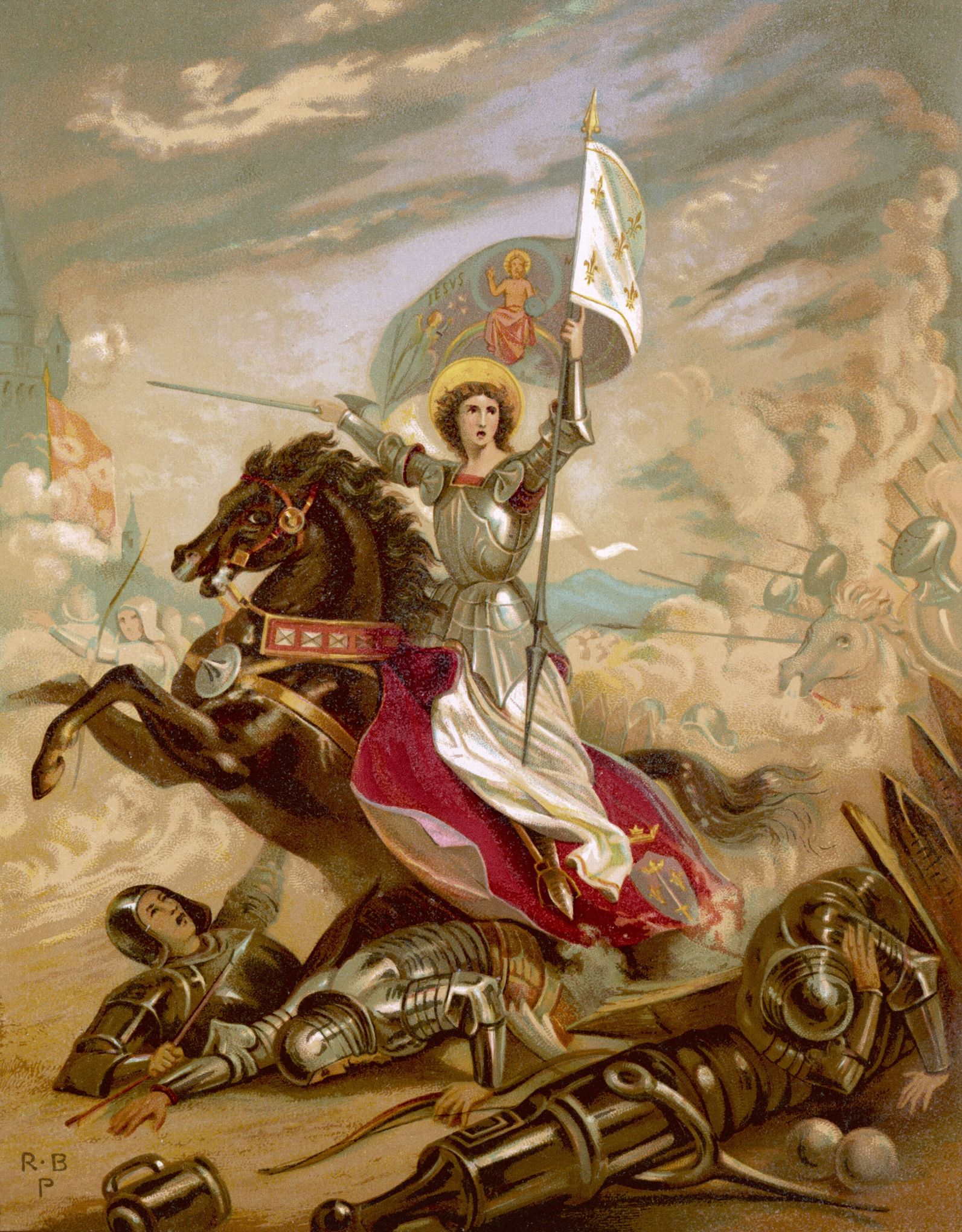
Jeanne d’Arc

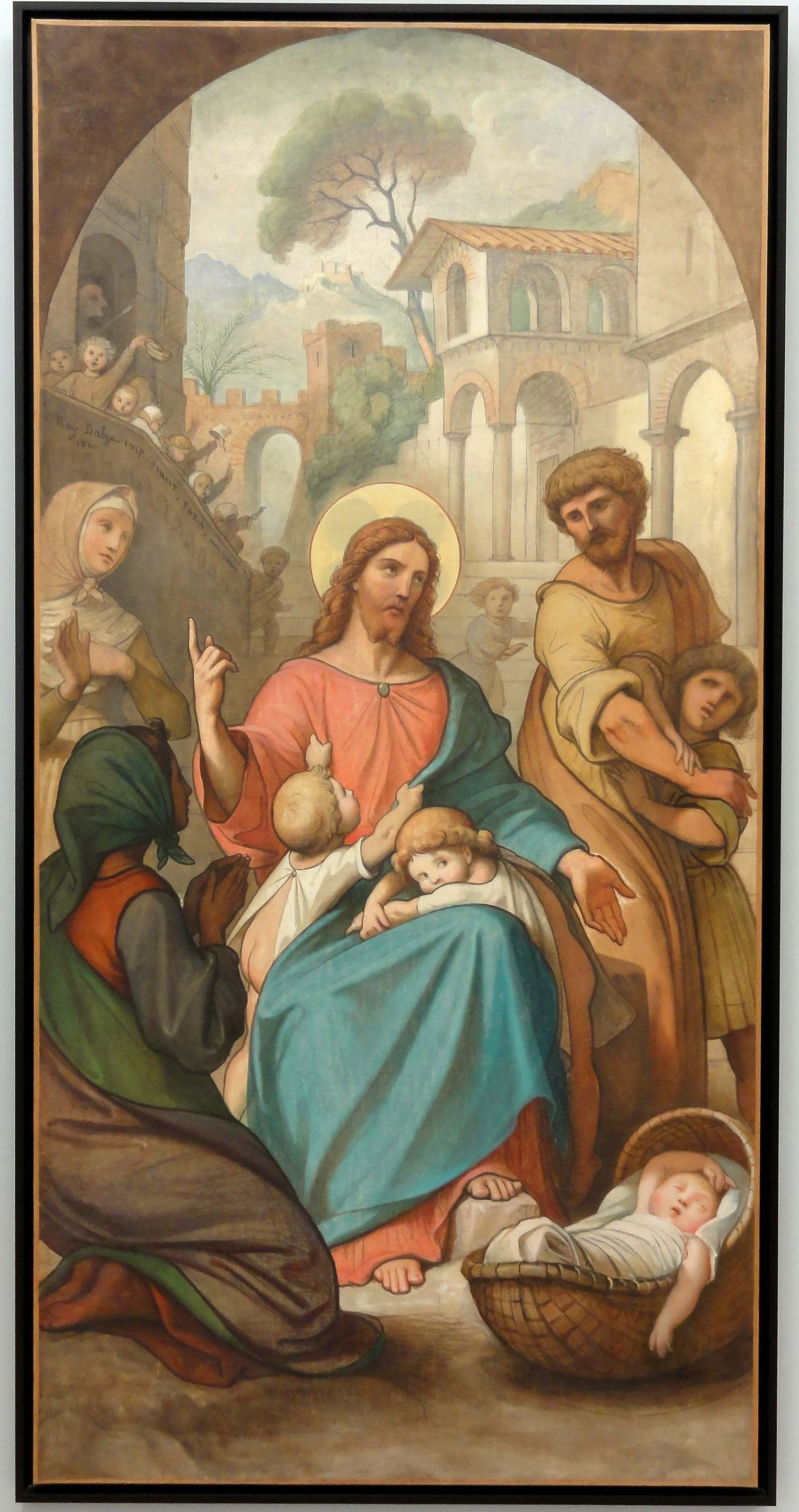
Let the little children come to me, 1866
