= Nicolas-Auguste Galimard =

French painter

- Born: 1813; Paris, France
- Died: 1880 (aged 66–67); Montigny-lès-Cormeilles, France
- Occupation: Painter
- Known for: pictures of Biblical subjects

Nicolas-Auguste Galimard (1813 Paris – 1880 Montigny-lès-Cormeilles) was a French historical, portrait and landscape painter.

== Studies ==
Galimard studied under his uncle, Auguste Hesse, and with Ingres, and soon became known for his pictures, chiefly of Biblical subjects.

== First works ==
His first exhibition was at the Salon of 1835, when he presented his painting of The Three Marys at the Tomb and of a Lady of the Fifteenth Century Galimard was just 22 years old and would continue to display works at the Salon until the Salon of 1880.

Galimard's Leda and the Swan was intended to be exhibited at the 1855 World Exhibition in Paris but was rejected by the jury on grounds of indecency. This decision was, of course, controversially discussed both by the public and by official art criticism and made the artist known beyond the borders of France. Napoleon III acquired the work and presented it as a gift to King Wilhelm I of Württemberg. The art collection of King Wilhelm II of Württemberg was auctioned on 26 and 27 October 1920 in the 77th sale conducted by the art dealer Felix Fleischhauer in Stuttgart. Since the 1920 auction, the painting Leda with the Swan had been owned by Adolf and Selma Wolf. In 1938, the painting Leda with the Swan was looted from the Jewish owner Selma Wolf by Nazi authorities in Stuttgart and transferred to the Sonderauftrag Linz for the planned Führermuseum in Linz. During the Nazi period, the painting was stored at Kremsmünster and remained until 1948 in the depot at Ennsegg (Upper Austria).

On 26 April 1948, Galimard's Leda with the Swan was transferred together with the other large-format paintings to the depot in Linz and has remained there to this day, housed in the Linz Castle Museum.

== Critics, stained glass and other works ==
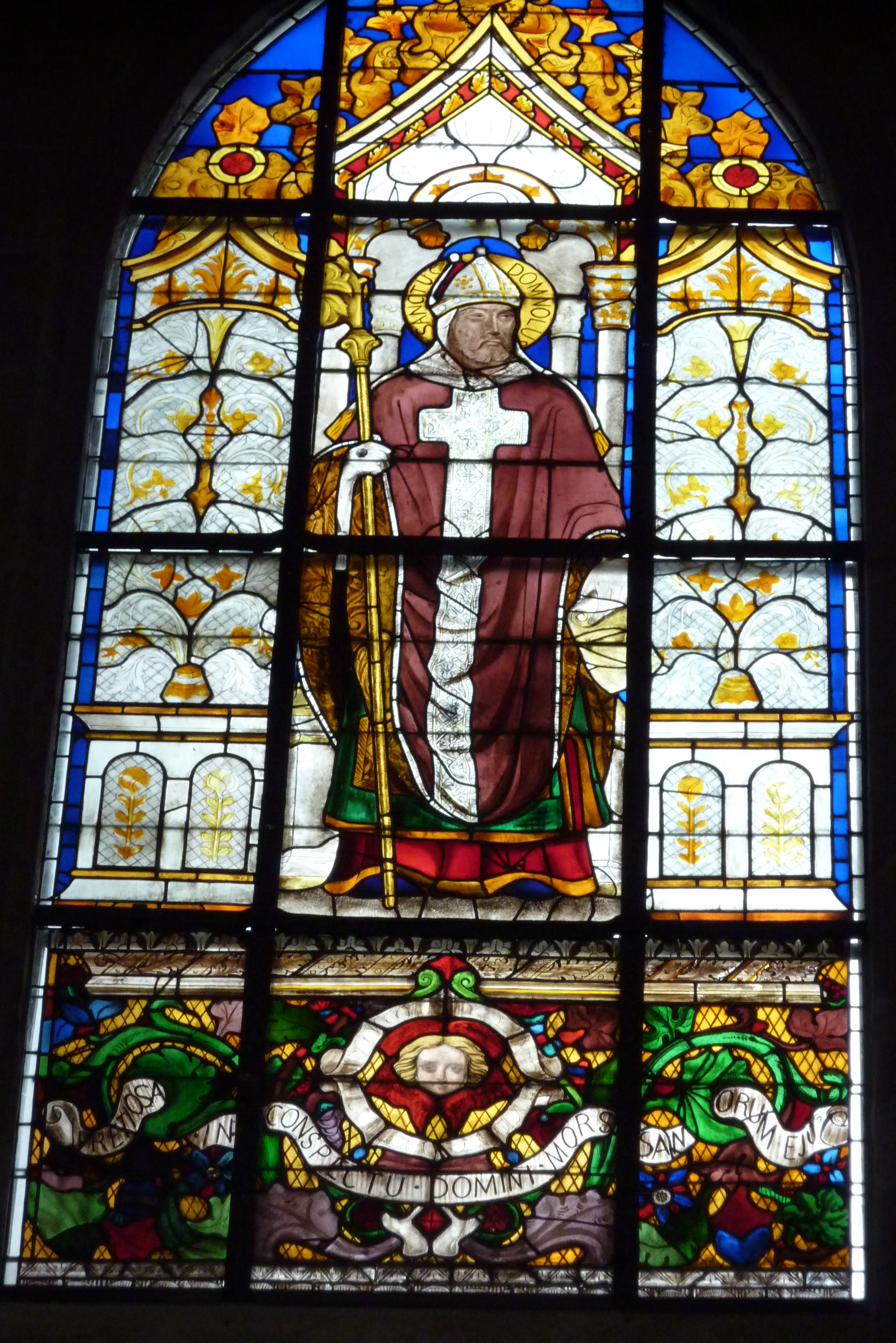
Saint Domnolus, stained glass window in the Saint-Laurent, Paris, 1846–1847, designed by Galimard

In 1855 at the Exposition Universelle Galimard's work on The Seduction of Leda was considered improper and rejected, however Napoleon III bought it and gave it to William I of Württemberg.

Galimard painted the Disciples at Emmaus for Saint-Germain l'Auxerrois, and mural decorations in the St. Germain-des-Prés, Paris. His picture of The Ode, exhibited at the Salon in 1846, is now in the Luxembourg Gallery. Many of Galimard's works have been engraved by Aubry-Lecomte and others. He made several designs for stained-glass windows, and wrote treatises on the subject.

== The secret art critic ==
Numerous articles were published by Galimard as an art critic using the names Judex, Dicastès and Richter in journals of the time like Gazette des Beaux-Arts, The Artist and La Patrie.
