= Paul Balze =

French painter

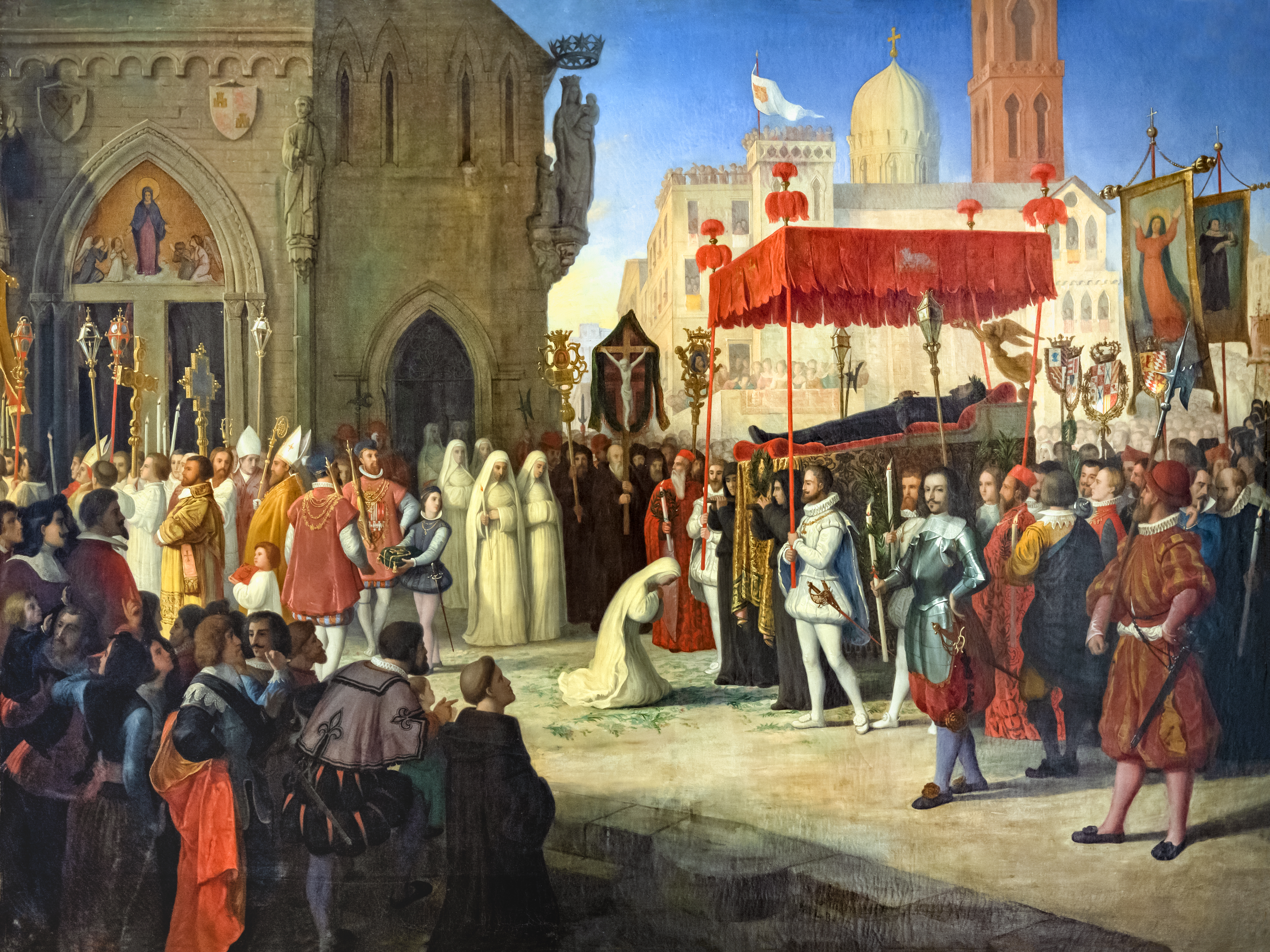
Funeral of Lope de Vega (1853) by Paul Balze, Musée Ingres Bourdelle

Paul Jean Étienne Balze (1815 – 24 March 1884) was a French painter and art copyist.

== Biography ==
He was born in Rome, the son of Joseph Balze (1781–1847), grand chamberlain to Charles IV of Spain during the latter's exile in Rome between 1811 and 1819. His brother Raymond Balze was also an artist. During his stay in Rome, Joseph Balze met the painter Jean Auguste Dominique Ingres and commissioned several works from him after 1814.

Paul entered the École des Beaux-Arts de Paris at the start of the 1830s, becoming copyist to the Louvre Museum. By now Ingres was director of the French Academy in Rome, from which he requested that Paul and Raymond be sent to copy the 1519 Vatican loggias by Raphael. These 52 copies were exhibited in 1840 in the chapel of the école des beaux-arts in Paris. In 1843, to reply to a request by Ingres to find a "home as a monument", Félix Duban proposed placing them on the first floor galleries in the Palais des Études. These copies were placed in the gallery vaults between 1854 and 1855 by the decorative painters Charles Chauvin and Camille-Auguste Gastine.

Paul Balze produced several other Raphael reproductions in faience and also took part in the decorative scheme of the Hôtel de la Banque de France in Paris. In 1855 he and Raymond made a copy of Ingres' The Apotheosis of Homer for one of the stairways in the Louvre. Between 1875 and 1881 the pair restored the Francesco Primaticcio frescoes in the abbot's chapel in Chaalis Abbey.

Paul Balze died in Paris on 24 March 1884.
