= Alfred-Nicolas Normand =

French architect and photographer

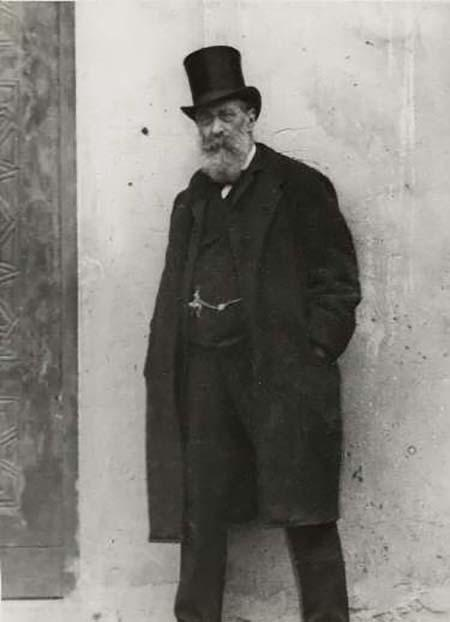
- Born: June 1, 1822; Paris, France
- Died: March 2, 1909 (aged 86); Paris, France
- Known for: Architecture

Alfred-Nicolas Normand (1 June 1822, Paris – 2 March 1909, Paris) was a French architect and photographer.

== Biography ==
His father, Louis-Eléonor Normand (1780-1862), was also an architect and provided some of his first lessons. In 1842, he entered the École des Beaux-Arts, where his primary instructor was Alphonse-Françoise Marie Jaÿ. He won the Prix de Rome in 1846, with his design for a natural history museum, and lived at the Villa Medici from 1847 to 1851.

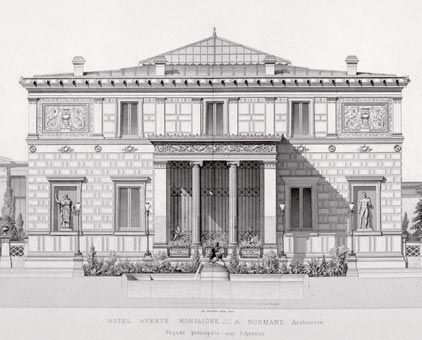
Normand's design for the Maison Pompéienne

Upon returning to France, he developed an interest in photography. Maxime Du Camp, who had recently returned from a trip to the Middle East, encouraged his efforts and offered professional advice. He went back to the Mediterranean, and stayed until 1852, producing a series of over 130 calotypes in Rome, Pompeii, Athens and Istanbul. In 1855, after a successful showing at the Exposition Universelle, he decided to devote himself to architecture, rather than photography, although it would continue to be a hobby.

In 1853, he was named an inspector of works and a deputy to Victor Baltard, the official Architect of the City of Paris. His individual career was launched in 1856, when he was one of several architects chosen by Prince Napoléon-Jérôme to design a palace in Neo-Grecian style that would come to be known as the Maison Pompéienne. When his work there was completed, in 1860, he was named a Knight in the Legion of Honor. It was demolished in 1891, due to years of neglect after the establishment of the Third Republic.

He was named Inspector General for prison buildings in 1861, and built the Centre pénitentiaire de Rennes, a women's prison, between 1867 and 1876. In response to a law passed in 1875, requiring individual confinement, he and his fellow architect, Joseph Auguste Émile Vaudremer, drew up a plan for cells organized around a central courtyard; a plan which still plays a major role in prison design.

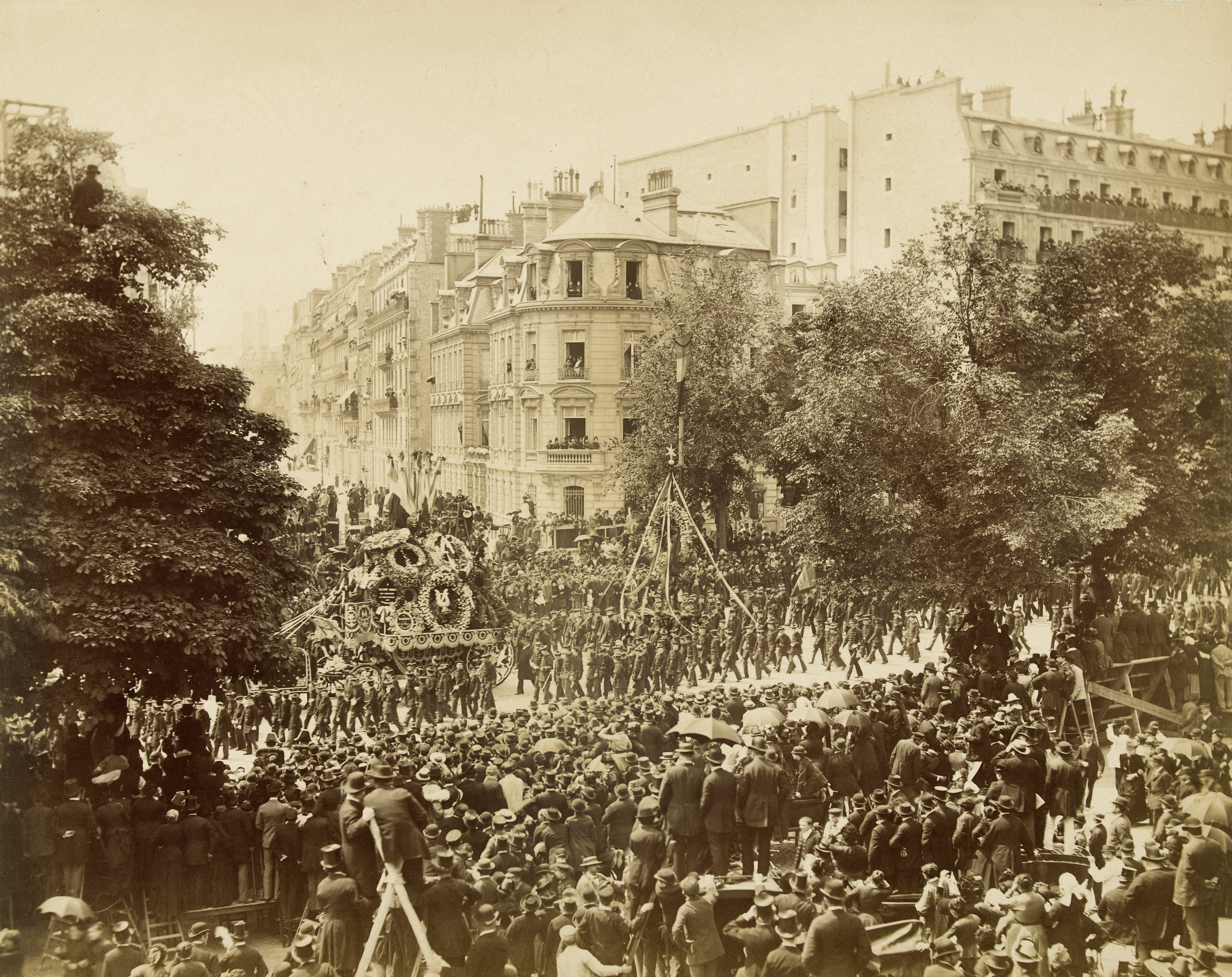
Funerals of Victor Hugo, on 1st June 1885.

In the late 1870s, he also did reconstructive work on the Arc de Triomphe and the column at the Place Vendôme. From 1882 to 1887, he added a swimming pool and classrooms to the lycée Michelet in Vanves. After that, he indulged his interest in photography by taking an extended trip throughout France, Italy, Greece, North Africa, Scandinavia and Russia, making a photographic record of vernacular structures, as well as monuments.

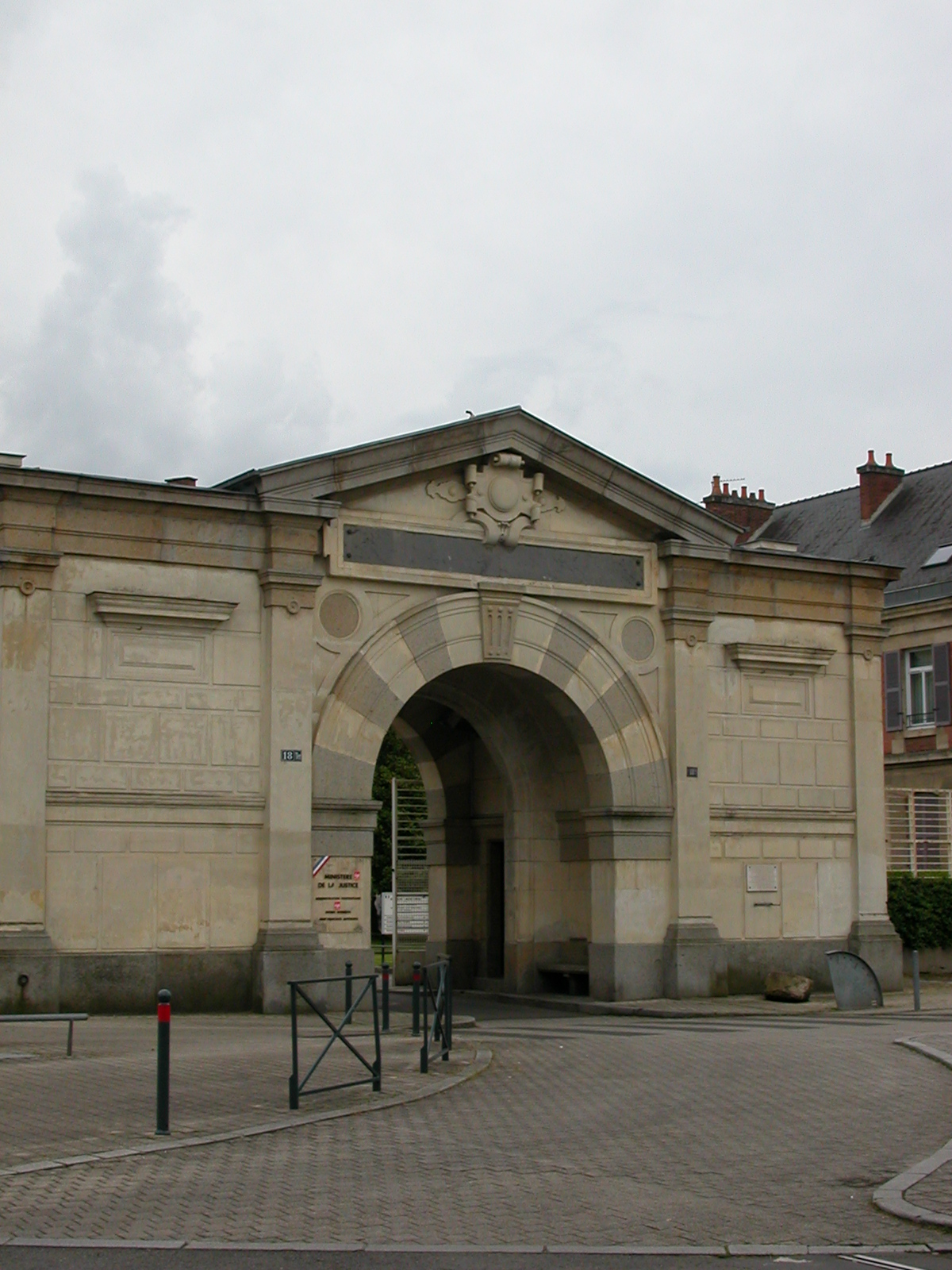
Entrance to the Centre pénitentiaire de Rennes

He was elected to the Académie des Beaux-Arts in 1890, taking Seat #6 for architecture. From 1898 to 1900, he was President of the Société Centrale des Architectes. He also served as vice-president of the Société Française de Photographie.

He had three sons; Charles (1858-1934), an art historian, Paul (1861-1945), an architect, and Robert (1873-1929), a military engineer, with the rank of General, who participated in constructing the Maginot Line.
