= Hôtel Porgès =

Coordinates: 48.8659°N 2.3047°E

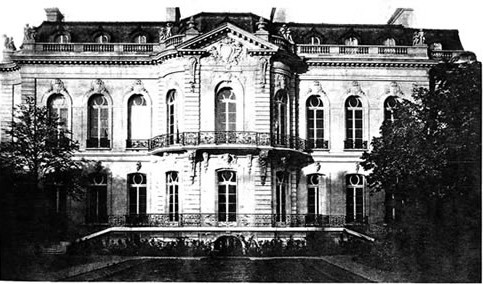
Its garden facade

The Hôtel Porgès was a hôtel particulier on Avenue Montaigne in Paris, designed for Jules Porgès in 1892 by Ernest Sanson, with a garden by Achille Duchêne, on the site of the Maison pompéienne. It was sold in 1937 after his widow's death and demolished in the 1960s to make way for flats.
