= Blaise Alexandre Desgoffe =

French painter

Blaise Alexandre Desgoffe (January 17, 1830 – May 2, 1901) was a French painter who specialized in meticulously finished still-life paintings. He was the nephew of the painter Alexandre Desgoffe and father of the painter Jules Desgoffe.

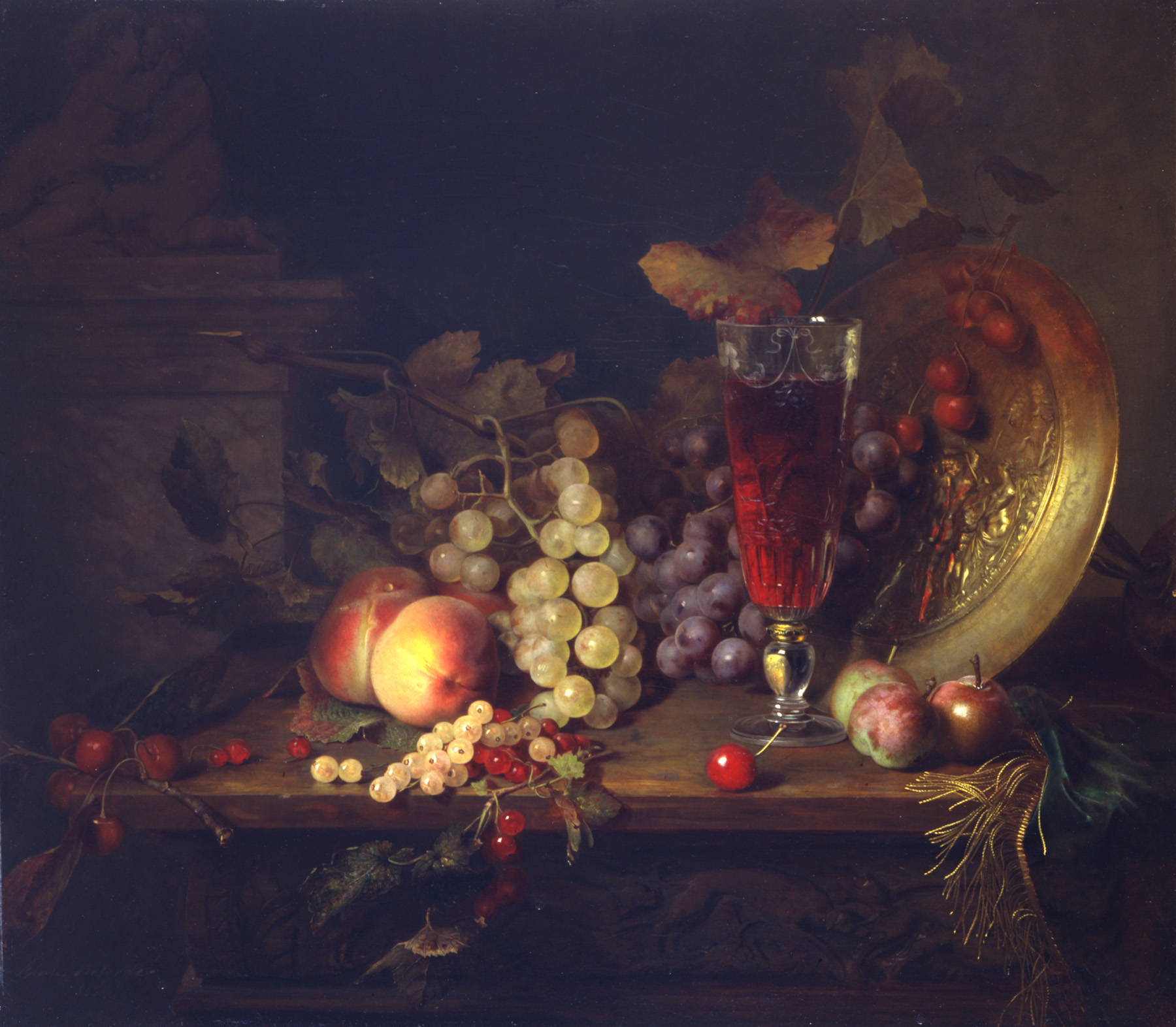
Blaise Alexandre Desgoffe, Still Life with Fruit, Glass of Wine, 1863, oil on panel

He was born in Paris and studied under Hippolyte Flandrin. He exhibited at the Paris Salon from 1857 to 1882, where he was awarded a third-class medal in 1861 and a second-class medal in 1863. In 1878 he was made a Chevalier of the Légion d'honneur. He was awarded a silver medal at the Exposition Universelle of 1900. He died in Paris in 1901.
