= Villa of Diomedes =

Ancient Roman villa near Pompeii, Italy

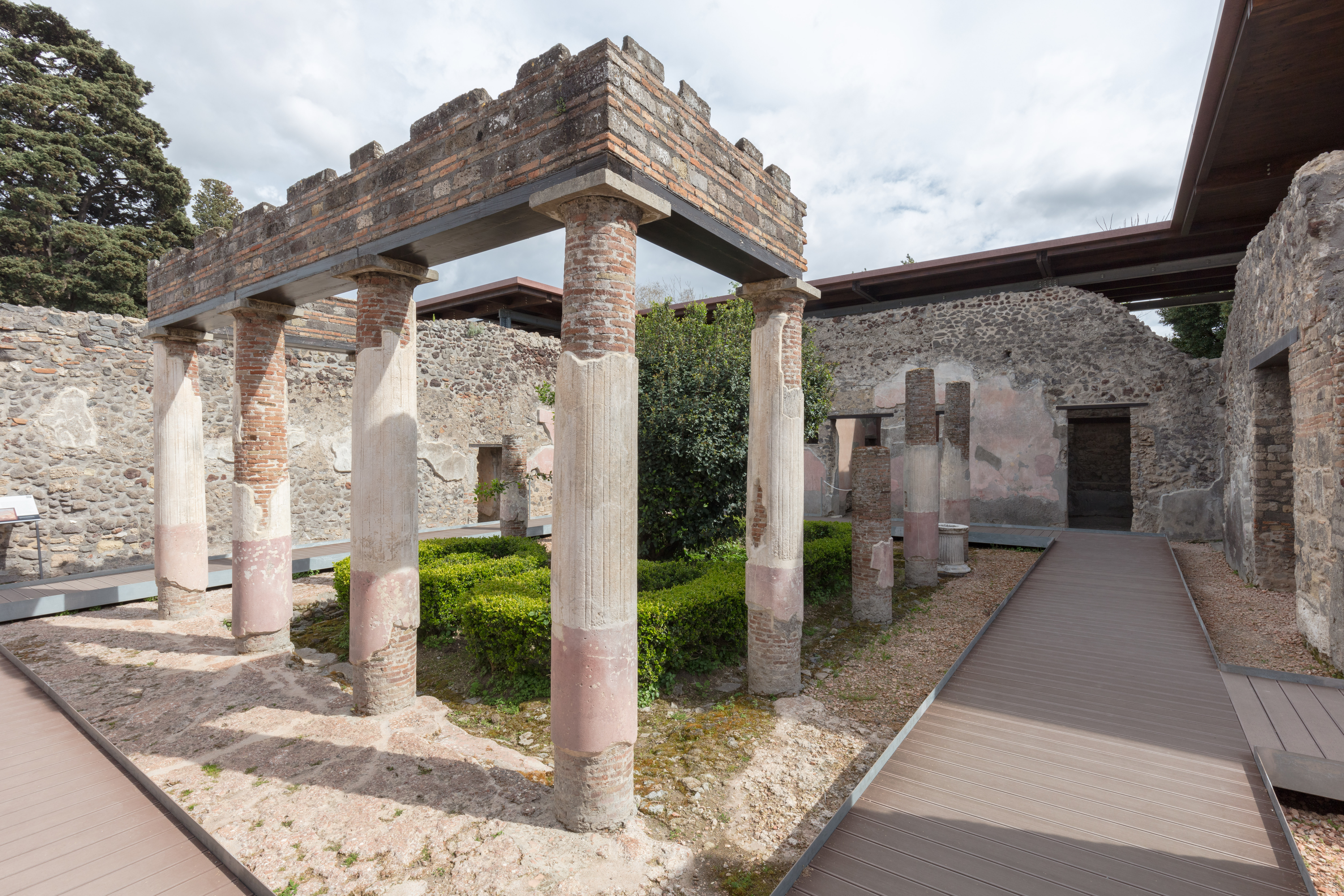
Villa of Diomedes

The Villa of Diomedes is an ancient Roman villa near Pompeii, Italy.

It is located outside the walls of Pompeii on the Via dei Sepolcri to the Gate of Herculaneum.

It was excavated from 1771 to 1774 by Francesco La Vega.

It was named after Marcus Arrius Diomedes, whose grave is opposite the entrance to the villa, though it is not clear that it was in fact his villa.

== Description ==
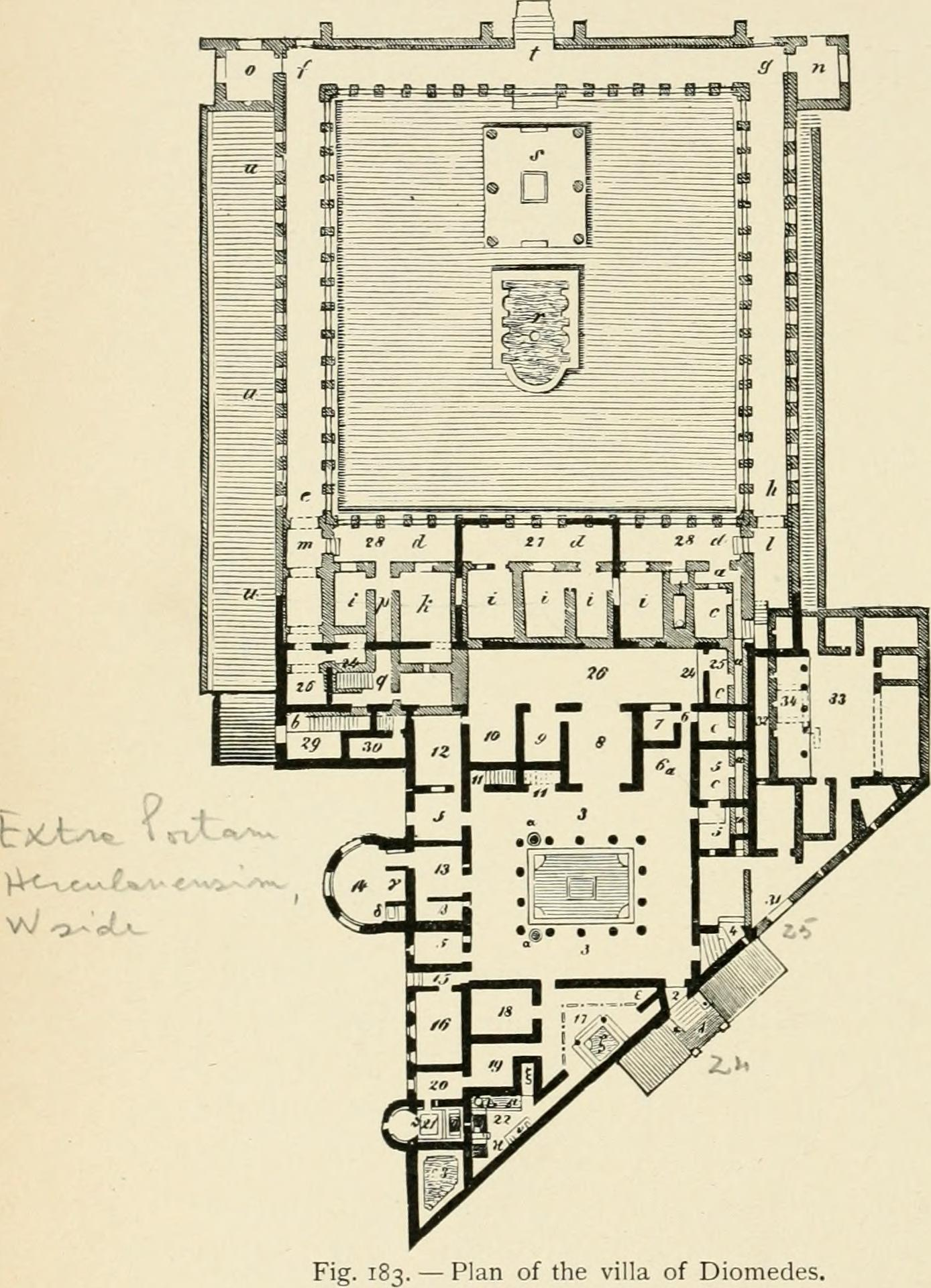
Floor plan

Architecture and Site

The villa sits just outside the city walls on the north side of Pompeii. It is around 3500 square meters. The garden side of the building faces what would have been the ancient coast line to the East. The west side of the villa borders the road leading to the Herculaneum Gate.

The villa is on two levels. On the first level, just inside the entrance, there is a peristyle, which shows the wealth of Diomedes as it was the custom for wealthy families to have these. Around the Peristyle are bathrooms, a kitchen wing, and various living spaces. Also on the main level is the tablinum, where records are held. Between the garden and the tablinum is a terrace overlooking the gardens. A staircase in the south-east corner of the peristyle leads down to the garden, which remain un-excavated. On each side of the terrace is a set of stairs that lead to the lower level of the villa. The lower section of the villa is mainly a large outdoor space. Here there is a large peristyle with seventeen columns on each side. In the middle of this great garden is a summer triclinium with a pool of water in front of it. The villa was decorated with plain wall paintings of the Fourth Style, which are poorly preserved. On the lower level of the villa there are some below grade storage areas with traces of amphorae.

Remains

A total of 36 bodies were found in the villa. One skeleton had a cloth containing coins worth 1356 sesterces (ten gold medals, 88 silver medals and nine bronze), one of the richest finds of money in the city. This man had a key and was wearing a gold ring. In the basement were skeletons of eighteen other women, servants, and children, who were likely suffocated there by invading gases. Théophile Gautier's Arria Marcella (1852) and Ferdinand Gregorovius' poem "Euphorion" were set here. The Maison pompéienne in Paris was inspired by it.

== Bibliography ==
- Eugenio La Rocca, M. de Vos Raaijmakers, A. Vos of: Luebbe archaeological leader Pompeii. Gustav Lübbe Verlag, Bergisch Gladbach 1979, ISBN 3-7857-0228-0, pp 237–340.
