= Maison pompéienne =

Neo-Grec style house in Paris, 1860–1891

Coordinates: 48.8659°N 2.3046°E

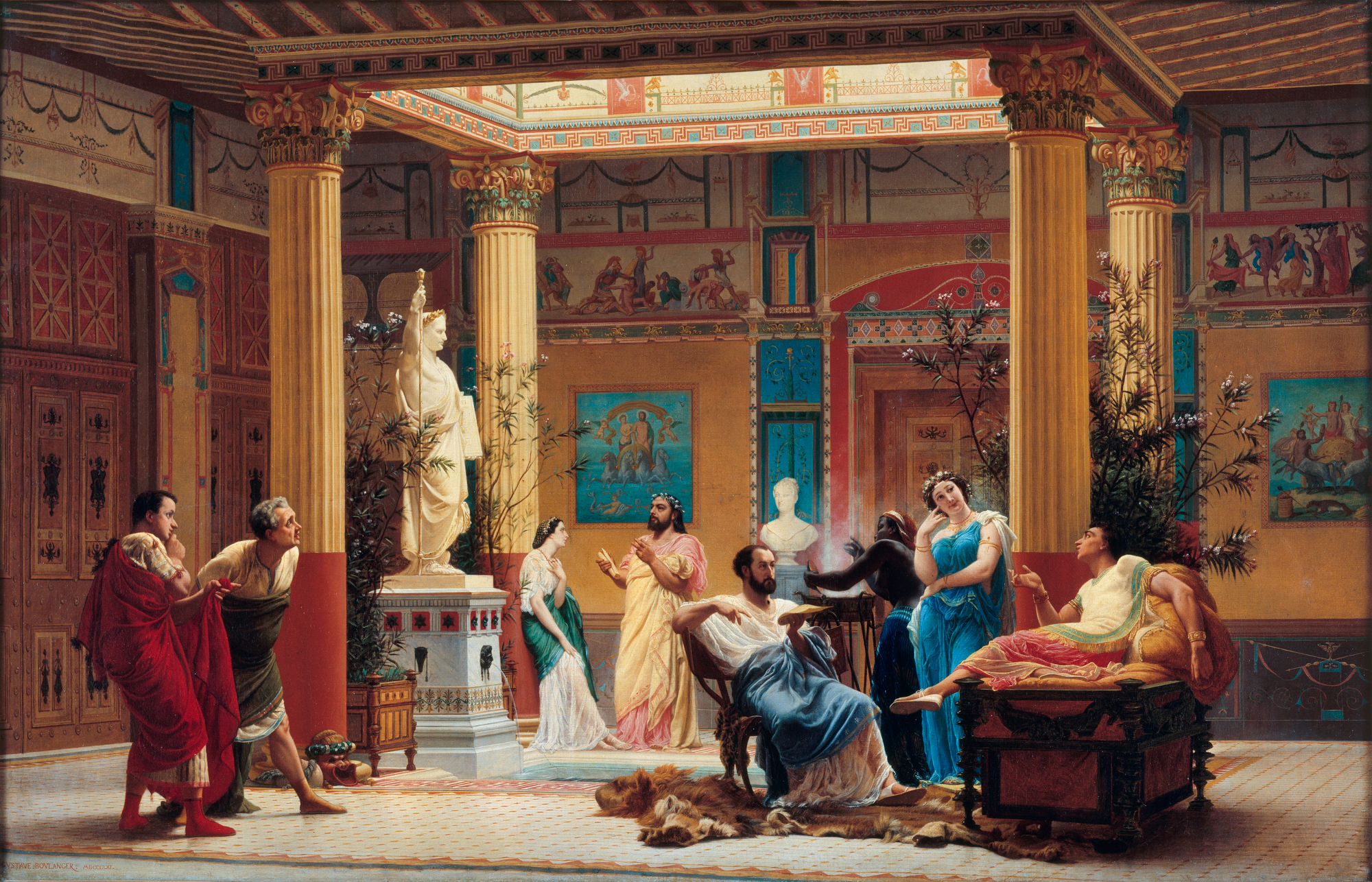
Gustave Boulanger, Répétition du "Joueur de flûte" et de la "Femme de Diomède" chez le prince Napoléon, 1861

...on pourrait se croire à Pompéia, rue de Mercure ou de la Fortune, avant l'éruption du volcan; car ce n'est point un à peu près élégant, mais une restitution rigoureuse où Vitruve lui-même ne trouverait rien à reprendre, un traité d'archéologie d'une science profonde écrit en pierre et qu'on peut habiter.

— Théophile Gautier, 1866

The interior deserves inspection, but it can hardly be called a specimen of ancient Roman domestic architecture, as the plan of villas differed considerably from that of ordinary dwelling-houses.

— Baedeker's Paris, 1878

The Maison pompéienne ('Pompeian house' French pronunciation: [mɛzɔ̃ pɔ̃pejɛn]), sometimes called the Palais pompéien 'Pompeian palace' was the hôtel particulier of Prince Napoléon-Jérôme in Paris in the style of the Villa of Diomedes near Pompeii. It was located at 16-18 avenue Montaigne from 1860 to 1891.

It was built in 1856–1860 on the former site of the Pavillon des Beaux-Arts of the Exposition Universelle of 1855. As president of the Exposition, Jérôme had bought the land for it. The architects included Jacques-Ignace Hittorff, Auguste Rougevin, and finally Alfred-Nicolas Normand. Camille-Auguste Gastine created the decorative schemes in the Pompeian style. Its interior paintings included works by Sébastien Cornu and Jean-Léon Gérôme. It is considered a good example of Neo-Grec style.

When Prince Napoléon went into exile, he sold it to investors, who opened it to the public during the Exposition Universelle of 1867. It was abandoned during the Siege of 1871 and was in poor condition by 1889. It was demolished in 1891, and the Hôtel Porgès was built on the site.

== See also ==
- Villa Kerylos, a Greek-style villa on the French Riviera
- Villa Lysis, with neoclassical elements, in Capri
- Getty Villa, Pacific Palisades, California
- Achilleion Palace, Corfu

== Bibliography ==
- Théophile Gautier, Le Palais pompéien de l'avenue Montaigne: étude sur la maison gréco-romaine, 1866, full text
