= Centre pénitentiaire de Rennes =

French prison for women

Coordinates: 48°06′03″N 1°40′27″W

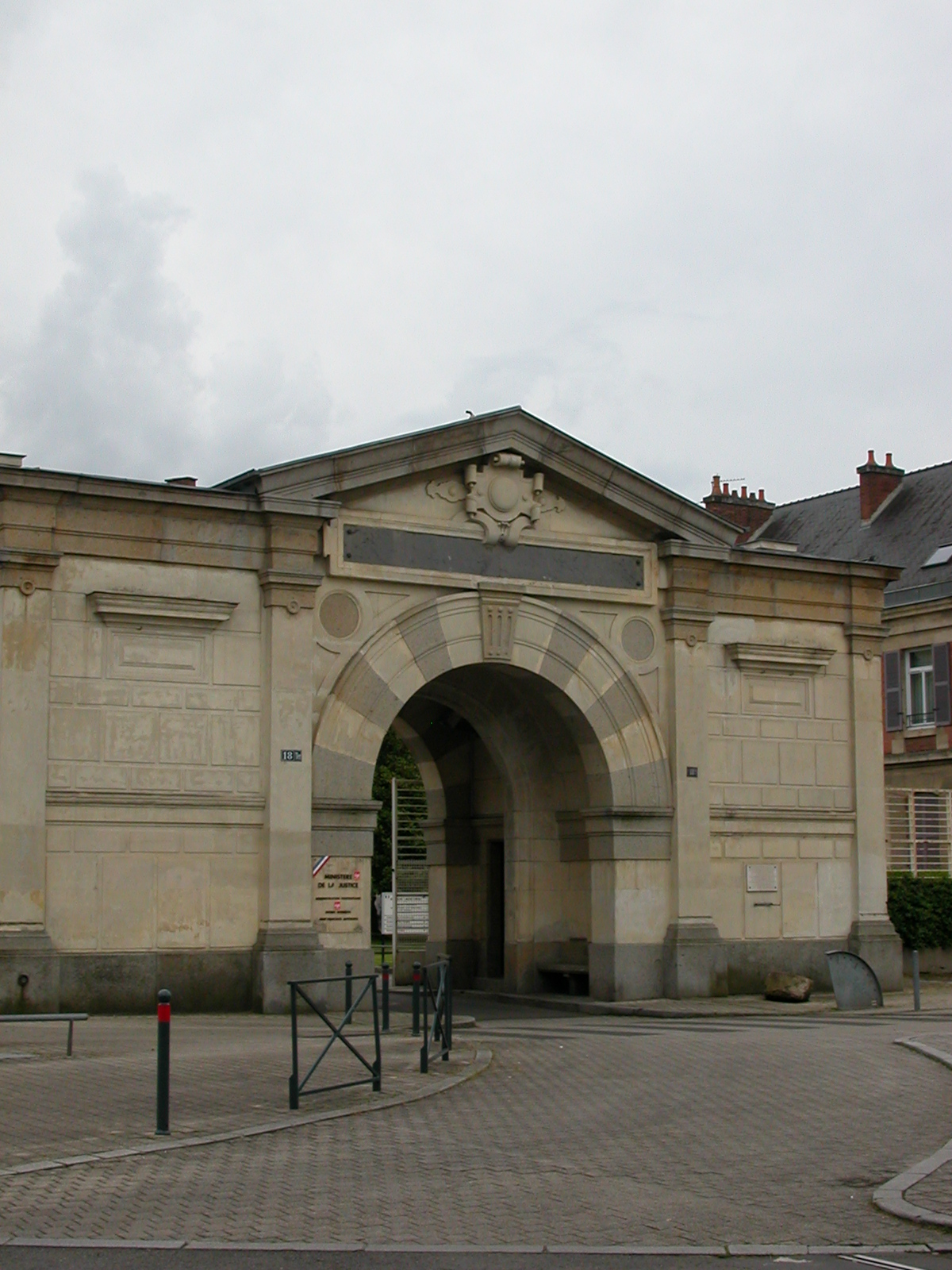
Entrance to the prison

The Centre pénitentiaire de Rennes is a women's prison of the French Prison Service in Rennes, Brittany, France. Since 2008, it has been the only women's prison in France. Its operations began in 1878. It was designed by the architect, Alfred-Nicolas Normand. The prison also inspired the name of the character “Rennes”, from the 1997 Canadian horror film Cube.
