= Art and morality =

Art and morality have been discussed, compared and linked for as long as they have been identified as concepts.

== History and ideas ==
In the Republic, Plato saw the function of the actor as bogus, presenting a dangerous illusion of reality, and masking the truth of existence by the pretence of acting. Aristotle, in The Poetics, saw the role of the actor somewhat differently, suggesting that by witnessing pity and fear (in his view the essence of tragedy) on stage, an audience could experience a catharsis of the emotions associated with real tragic events, without having to experience them as first-hand participants.

Since then, the 'stand-off' between those who have seen art as having a direct impact on morality, and those who have asserted its independence, has persisted. Tolstoy was ambivalent about the role of the artist (despite being one himself). In What is Art? he castigated now-canonical artists such as Shakespeare, Goethe and Wagner for failing to express the 'simple truths' about morality (as he saw them), opting instead to show off their poetic cleverness. He saw their work as morally reprehensible, effectively a wasting of their talents through their failure to communicate moral truth to the masses.

Since the late nineteenth century and beyond, with the development of 'the arts' as a cultural concept, the debate about art and morality has intensified, with the ever more challenging activities of artists becoming targets for those who see art as an influence for bad or good, and it has been a mainstay of many art critics' negative reviews. John Ruskin accused Whistler of "flinging a pot of paint in the face of the audience", and several of the ballets of Diaghilev scandalised audiences with their explicit (at the time) sexual themes.

Whistler and Ruskin eventually went face-to-face in the courtroom. But in 1961, one of the most famous legal clashes between art and morality occurred when Penguin Books were taken to court over their publication of D. H. Lawrence's novel Lady Chatterley's Lover. Similarly, in 1977 the Christian morality campaigner Mary Whitehouse successfully sued a magazine, Gay News, under blasphemous libel laws.

In popular culture, pornography (if seen in aesthetic terms) is used as an example of the objectification of women, and violent films have been cited as the influence for so-called copycat acts in reality. An example of this was the Hungerford Massacre, where a gunman was alleged by the tabloid press to have been influenced by the Rambo series of films starring Sylvester Stallone.

In September 2001, shortly after the World Trade Center Attack, the German composer Karlheinz Stockhausen said of the atrocity that it was "Lucifer's greatest work of art." (However, Stockhausen's comments were taken out of context and misunderstood.) The responses were immediate and extreme, fuelled once again by the tabloid press. Some have found, here and elsewhere, art in the service of morality to be politically dangerous.

In purely philosophical terms, the precise nature of art's links with morality have been long been questioned. Some have found no link between the aesthetic and the moral (i.e. being morally reprehensible does not deny an artwork its art status; it does not cease having aesthetic value no matter how depraved some might see it being), whereas others, who have not gone down the explicitly Platonist route, have argued that the relationship is one akin to supervenience. Here, it is argued that an essential component of the production of art, the human factor, can only be made sensible if taken along with the perceived moral codes which govern humanity.
