= Alexandre Desgoffe =

French painter

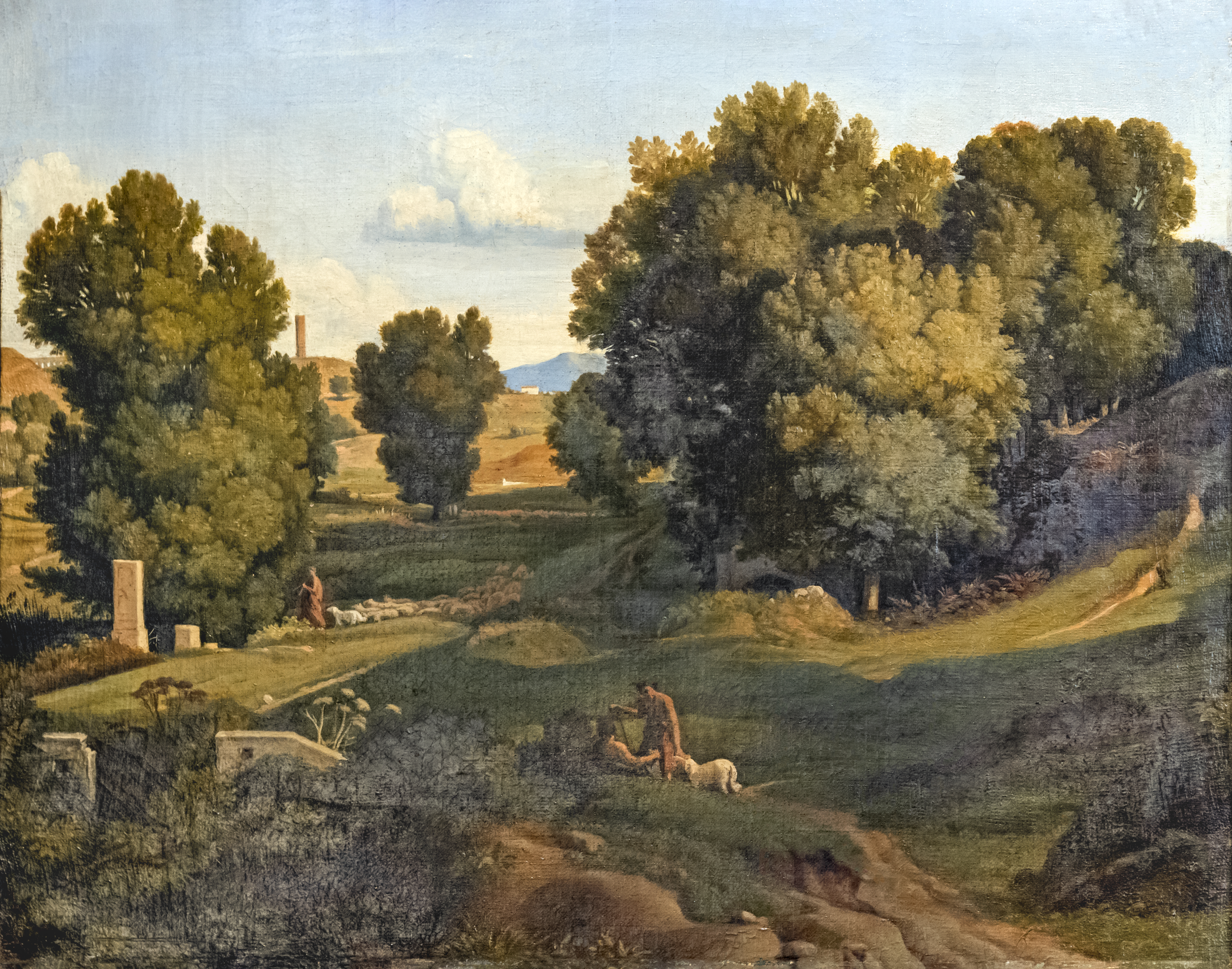
The Valley of the Nymph Egeria

Alexandre Desgoffe (1805–1882) was a French landscape painter born in Paris. He studied under Ingres, and travelled in Italy from 1837 to 1842. He usually introduced into his landscapes historical or mythological incidents, and he also painted some Biblical subjects. The Luxembourg Gallery has his Fury of Orestes, and the Museum of Lyons his Cyclops. He decorated the Salle des Etudes of the Bibliothèque Nationale in 1868. He died in Paris in 1882.

His nephew was the still-life painter Blaise Alexandre Desgoffe (1830–1901).
