= Camille-Auguste Gastine =

French painter

Camille-Auguste Gastine (1819 – 1867) was a French painter.

== Life ==
A student of Nicolas-Auguste Hesse, Paul Delaroche and François-Édouard Picot, he was trained at the École des Beaux-arts de Paris. He exhibited a Holy Family at the Salon of 1844, then travelled to Italy and stayed in Rome. He frequently collaborated on several monumental decorative schemes - that of the old Abbaye de Saint-Germain-des-Prés, with Hippolyte Flandrin in 1856; that of the chapel at the château de Broglie with Savinien Petit; and that of the chapelle Saint-Joseph in the Cathédrale Saint-André de Bordeaux with Sébastien Cornu.

He also designed stained glass windows, such as for a church of St Stephen and for the cathedrals at Lodève and Béziers, along with decorative schemes for the churches of Saint-Laurent-Rochefort, Chazelles-sur-Lyon, Montant and Saint-Albain. He also took part in the decorative schemes for the Maison pompéïenne at 16-18 Avenue Montaigne in Paris, the hôtel Granger, the hôtel Pereire, the hôtel du duc de Galliera, comte Murat's château and the Palais des Études of the École des beaux-arts de Paris between 1854 and 1855 and at the musée d'Amiens (now the Musée de Picardie). He also exhibited a Saint Catherine of Alexandria at the 1855 Exposition Universelle and produced portraits and several paintings of saints.
