= Vatican loggias =

Part of the Vatican palace

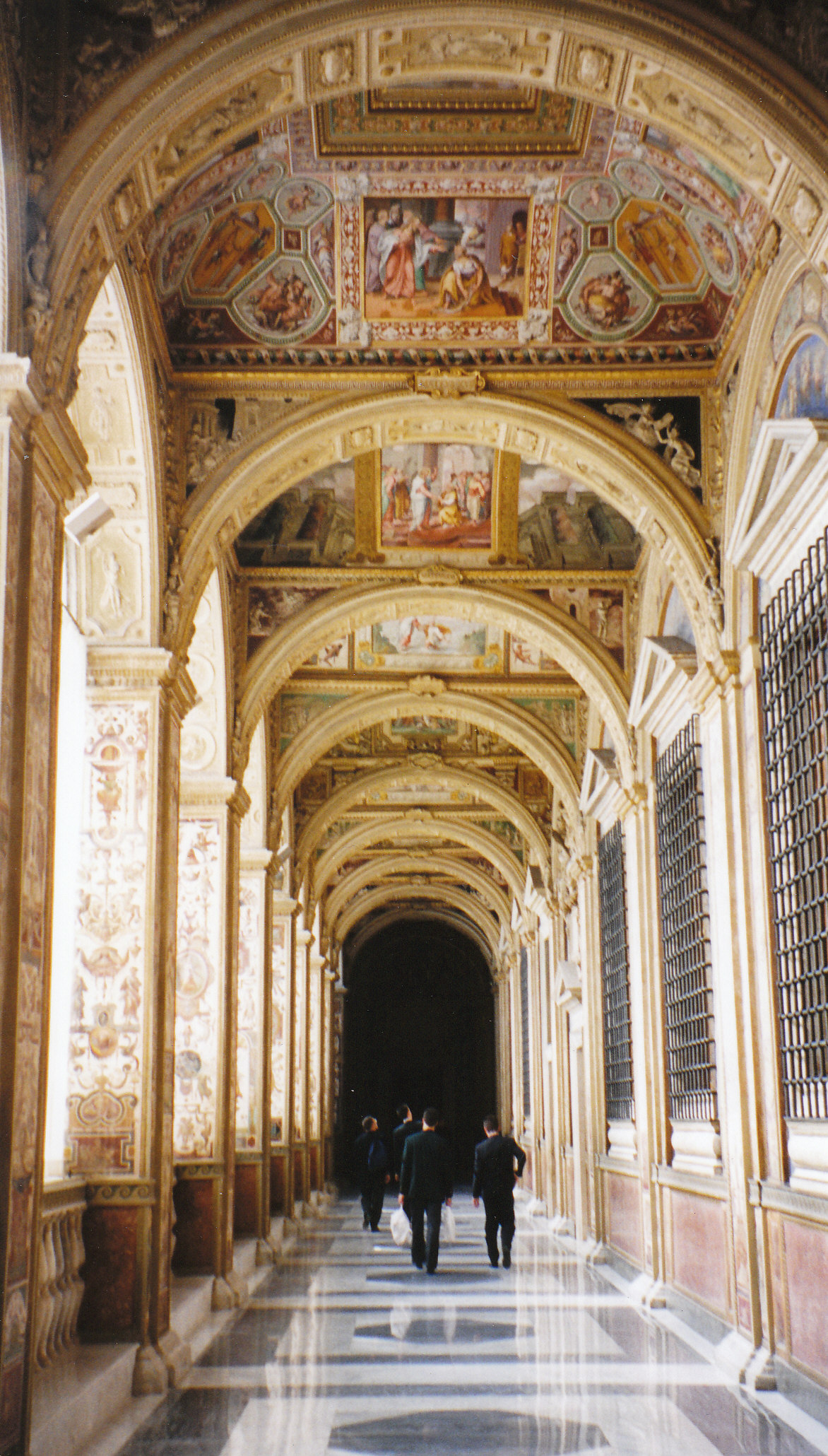

The Vatican loggias (Italian: Logge di Raffaello) are a corridor space in the Apostolic Palace, originally open to the elements on one side. Their construction was begun by Donato Bramante in 1512. They were decorated in fresco around 1519 by Raphael's large team of artists, with Giovanni da Udine involved. Because of the relative unimportance of the space, and a desire to copy the recently re-discovered Domus Aurea style of Ancient Roman painting, no large paintings were used, and the surfaces were mostly covered with grotesque designs on a white background, with paintings imitating sculptures in niches, and small figurative subjects in a revival of Ancient Roman style. This large array provided a repertoire of elements that were the basis for later artists creating grotesque decoration across Europe.

The loggias now form part of the ceremonial route for distinguished visitors such as visiting dignitaries and diplomats, but are not otherwise openn to tourists.

Between 1787 and 1792, the architect Giacomo Quarenghi constructed a full copy of the loggias, called the Raphael Loggias, in the Large Hermitage, Saint Petersburg.

== Scheme ==
The layout of the scenes in the loggia does not always align when transitioning from bay to bay. As a result, the table below does not display the biblical events in chronological order, but according to the orientation of the loggia itself.

The scheme of the ceiling of the Raphael Loggia from north to south is as follows:

East	South	West	North
Bay I - The Creation
Separation of Light and Darkness			
Separation of Light and Darkness	Separation of Land and Water	Creation of the Sun and Moon	Creation of Animals
Bay II - Adam and Eve
The Fall of Man	Expulsion from Eden	The First Children	The Creation of Eve
Bay III - Noah
The Ark on Mount Ararat	The Sacrifice of Noah	The Building of the Ark	The Flood
Bay IV - Abraham
God and Abraham	Lot Fleeing Sodom	Abraham and Melchizedek	Abraham and the Three Angels
Bay V - Isaac
Abimelech Spies and Isaac and Rebecca	Isaac and Esau	God and Isaac	Isaac and Jacob
Bay VI - Jacob
Jacob and Laban	Jacob Returns to Canaan	The Dream of Jacob	Jacob and Rachel
Bay VII - Joseph
The Treachery of Potiphar's Wife	The Dreams of Pharaoh	The Dreams of Joseph	Joseph Sold by his Brothers
Bay VIII - Moses (I)
The Water Gushing from the Rock	The Crossing of the Red Sea	The Finding of Moses	The Burning Bush
Bay IX - Moses (II)
The Pillar of Cloud	Moses Presenting the Law	Moses Receives the Tablets	The Golden Calf
Bay X - Joshua
Crossing the Jordan River	The Fall of Jericho	The Halting of the Sun	The Dividing of the Land Among the Tribes
Bay XI - David
David Sees Bathsheba	The Triumph of David	Samuel Anointing David	David and Goliath
Bay XII - Solomon
The Construction of the Temple	Solomon and the Queen of Sheba	The Consecration of Solomon by Zadok	The Judgement of Solomon
Bay XIII - Jesus
The Baptism of Christ	The Last Supper	The Nativity	The Adoration of the Magi

== See also ==
- Raphael Rooms
- Index of Vatican City-related articles
