= The Apotheosis of Homer (Ingres) =

Painting by Jean-Auguste-Dominique Ingres

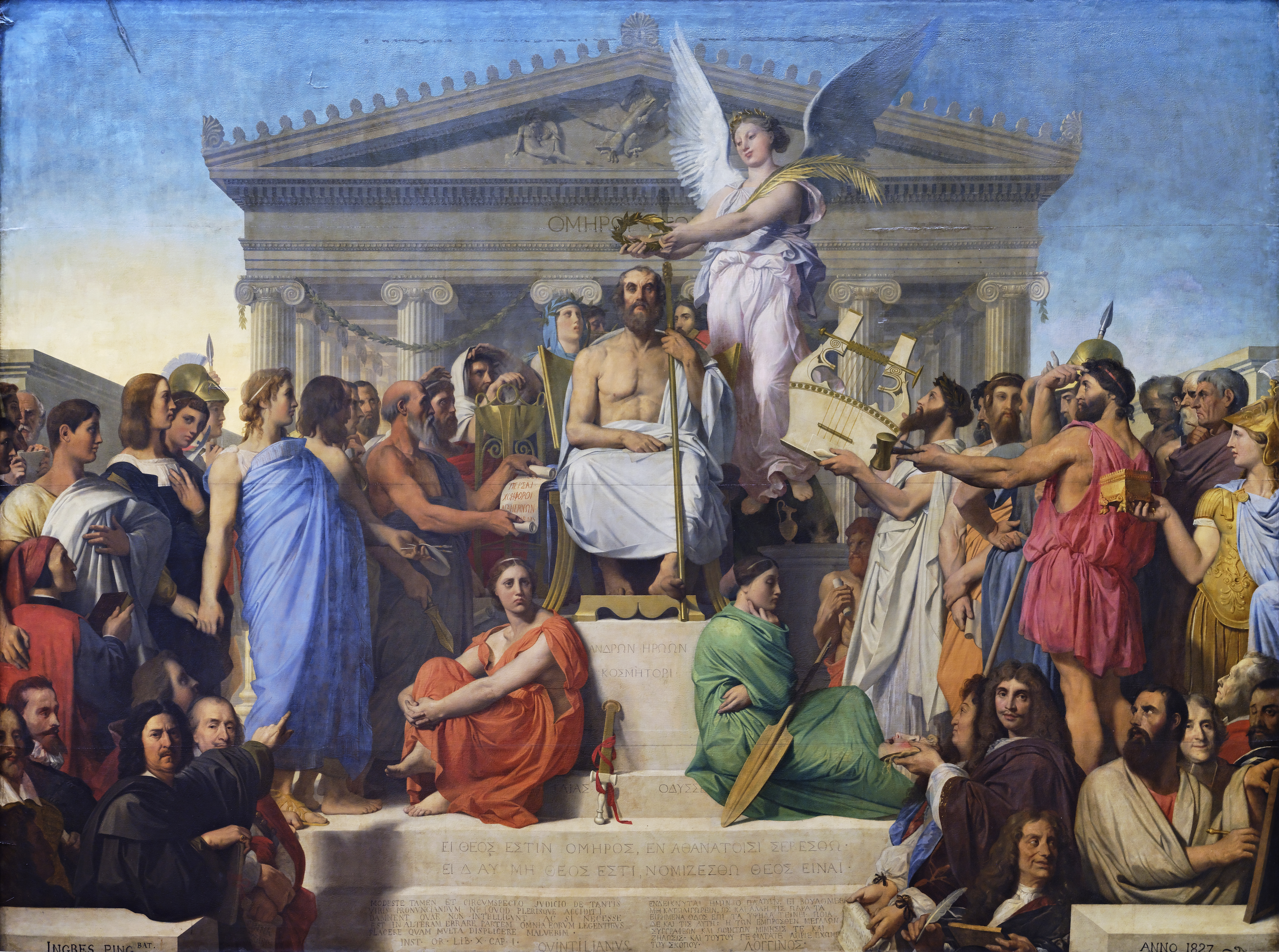
- Artist: Ingres
- Year: 1827
- Medium: oil on canvas
- Dimensions: 386 cm × 512 cm (152 in × 202 in)
- Location: Louvre, Paris

The Apotheosis of Homer is a grand 1827 painting by the French Neoclassical artist Jean-Auguste-Dominique Ingres, now exhibited at the Louvre as INV 5417. The symmetrical composition depicts Homer being crowned by a winged figure personifying Victory or the Universe. Forty-four additional figures pay homage to the poet in a kind of classical confession of faith.

== History ==
A state commission to decorate a ceiling of the musée Charles X at the Louvre (now the ancient Egyptian galleries), it formed part of a renovation project commissioned by Charles X to have himself remembered in the grand tradition of Bourbon building works at the Louvre. A condition of the commission was that it was to be completed within a year's time. Upon receiving the commission, Ingres conceived the idea for his painting quickly—it was a source of pride to him that he had required only an hour to establish the broad outlines of his composition in a sketch. The subsequent care he took in developing his idea is evident in more than 100 drawings and numerous painted sketches for it that survive, in which he fixed the details more and more precisely. Ingres's level of research can be seen in the painting's portrait of Nicolas Poussin, which is directly copied from Poussin's 1650 self-portrait now in the Louvre.

The composition is a symmetrical grouping centered in a classical way in front of an ancient Greek temple. The painting's catalogue entry at the time of its first exhibition described it as "Homer receiving homage from all the great men of Greece, Rome and modern times. The Universe crowns him, Herodotus burns incense. The Iliad and Odyssey sit at his feet."

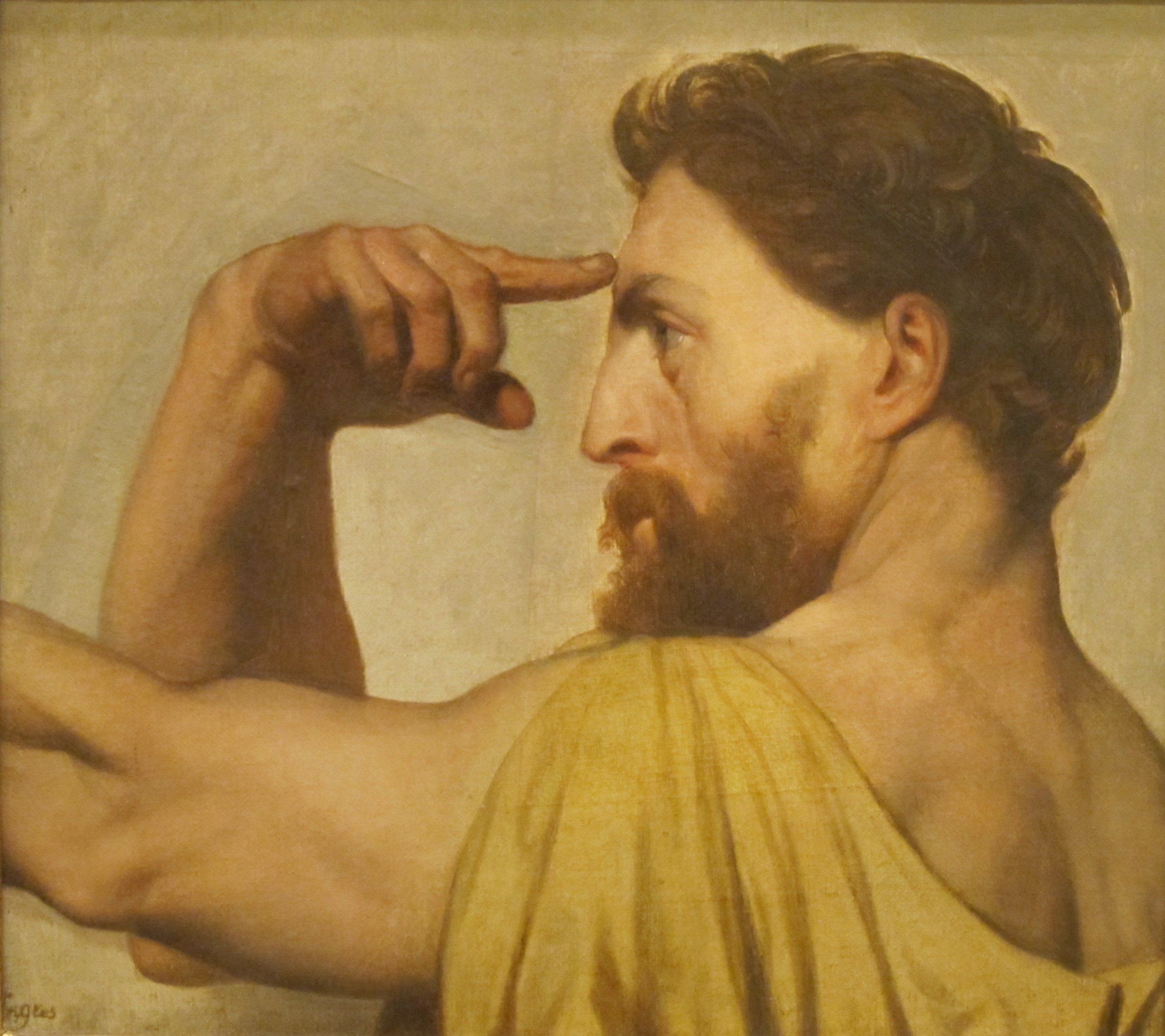
Study for Phidias in The Apotheosis of Homer, oil on canvas, 1827, San Diego Museum of Art

The final painting's colours are very fresh and clear, giving the impression of fresco. Ingres wished to compete with Raphael through this painting (it is strongly inspired by the Italian artist's Parnassus) and Raphael is to be seen top left (in black and white Renaissance dress), being led by Apelles (in a blue cloak). Other figures shown include Dante who is shown being led by Virgil as in the former's Divine Comedy (extreme left, behind Poussin) and Molière (right, by the feet of the personification of the Odyssey).

The art historian Robert Rosenblum said The Apotheosis of Homer represents "Ingres' most doctrinaire statement of his belief in a hierarchy of timeless values that are based on classical precedent." It is highly successful in its genre, though leaves an impression of coldness, an impression which was reinforced at the time of its production by the exhibition of Delacroix's The Death of Sardanapalus at the same year's Paris Salon. Ingres had been considered revolutionary early in his career, but this contrast now faced off a Romantic renewal under Delacroix against the purest classical tradition as shown by Ingres. The Apotheosis of Homer was taken down from its initial site in 1855 and replaced later that year with a copy by Paul and Raymond Balze (in collaboration with Michel Dumas).

== Figures shown ==
Surrounding Homer are poets, artists, and philosophers both ancient and modern—the modern personages are mostly confined to the lower register of the composition, although Ingres deemed Raphael and Michelangelo worthy of elevation to stand alongside the ancients. The figures are:

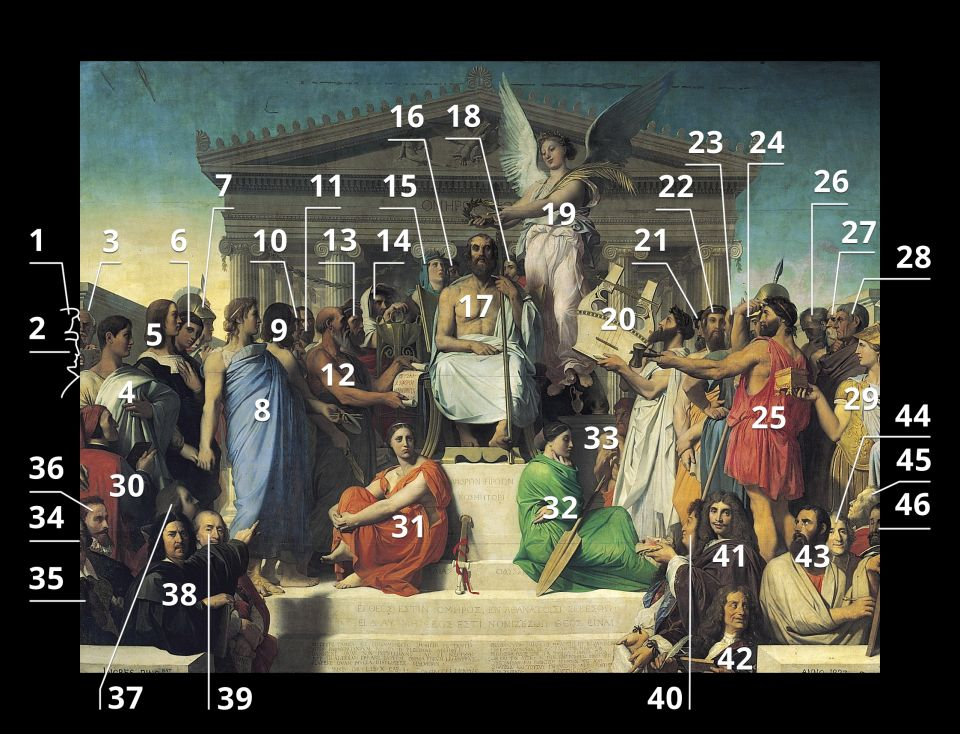

1. Horace
2. Peisistratos
3. Lycurgus
4. Virgil
5. Raphael
6. Sappho
7. Alcibiades
8. Apelles
9. Euripides
10. Menander
11. Demosthenes
12. Aeschylus
13. Sophocles
14. Herodotus
15. Orpheus
16. Linus
17. Homer
18. Musaeus of Athens
19. Victory or the Universe
20. Pindar
21. Hesiod
22. Plato
23. Socrates
24. Pericles
25. Phidias
26. Michelangelo
27. Aristotle
28. Aristarchus of Samothrace
29. Alexander the Great
30. Dante
31. Iliad personification
32. Odyssey personification
33. Aesop
34. William Shakespeare
35. Jean de la Fontaine
36. Torquato Tasso
37. Wolfgang Amadeus Mozart
38. Nicolas Poussin
39. Pierre Corneille
40. Jean Racine
41. Molière
42. Nicolas Boileau
43. Longinus
44. François Fénelon
45. Christoph Willibald Gluck
46. Luís Vaz de Camões

== Later repetitions ==
Ingres revisited the subject in several later works, including an undated watercolour (Lille, Musée des Beaux-Arts) and paintings such as Homer and His Guide (1861; Brussels, Royal Collection) and The Odyssey (Lyon, Musée des Beaux-Arts). In 1854 he began work on a drawing of the composition to be used as a model for the engraver Calamatta. This drawing, in which Ingres announced his intention to "amplify and complete" his conception, was not completed until 1865, as the artist deliberated at length in choosing the appropriate historical personages to be included. He ultimately added dozens of new figures, including Ictinus, Giulio Romano, John Flaxman, Jacques-Louis David, Pliny the Elder, Plutarch, Cosimo de Medici, Louis XIV, and Pope Leo X. Ingres also refined his selection by excluding Shakespeare, Tasso, and Camões from the 1865 drawing, as he had come to believe that they were too closely related to the Romantic tendency epitomized by his rival Delacroix.

== See also ==
- List of paintings by Jean-Auguste-Dominique Ingres
