= Nicolas-Auguste Hesse =

French painter

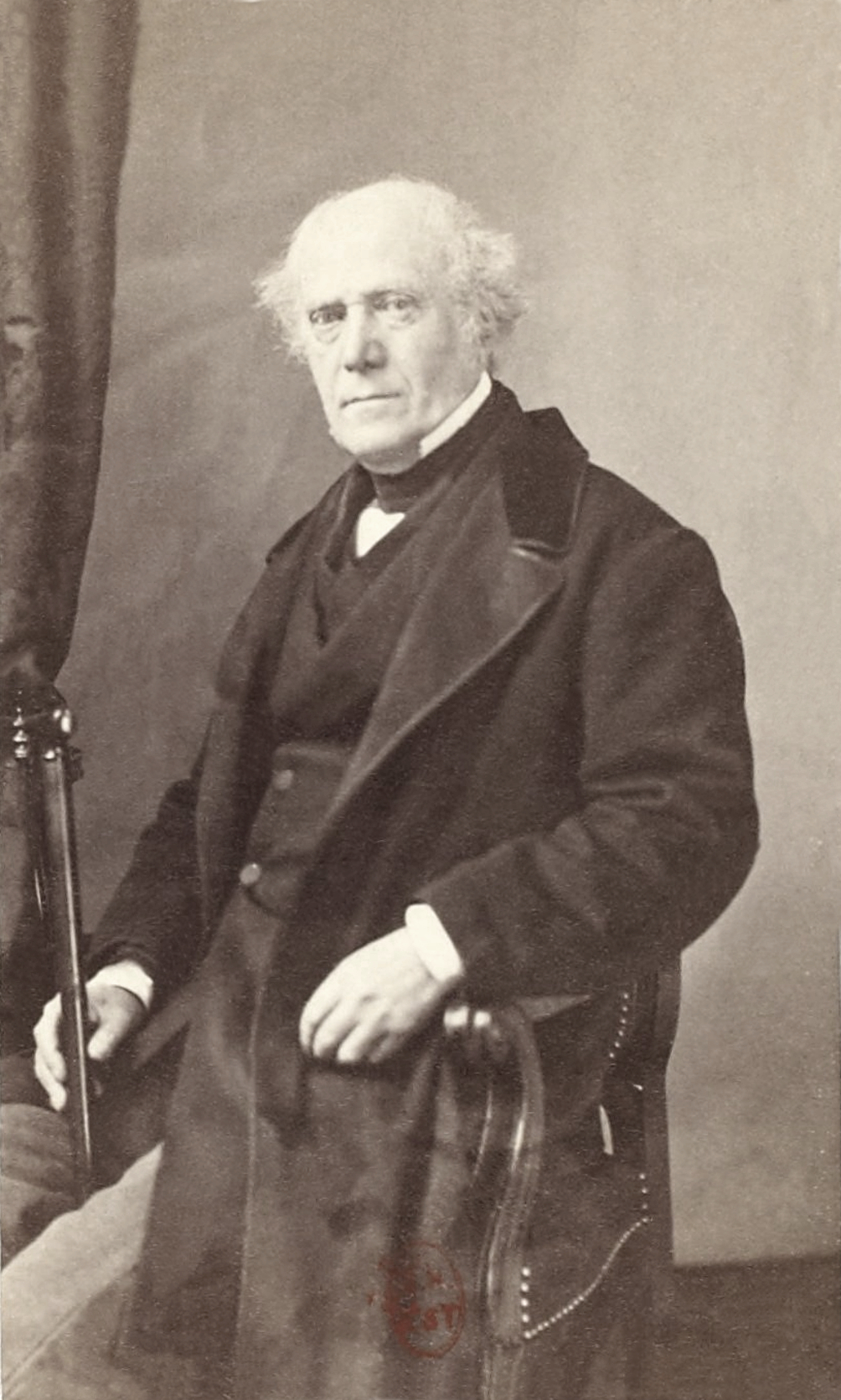
Hesse in 1865

Nicolas-Auguste Hesse (28 August 1795 – 14 June 1869) was a French painter and lithographer. He produced historical, mythological, religious and allegorical works along with portraits, wall paintings and designs for stained glass windows.

== Life ==
He was born in Paris. He studied under his brother Henri Joseph Hesse and under baron Antoine-Jean Gros. He was the uncle of the painter Alexandre Hesse. He entered the École des beaux-arts de Paris in August 1811 and won the 1818 prix de Rome with Baucis and Philemon receiving Jupiter and Mercury.

He first exhibited at the Salon of 1824 and from then on became one of the most noted painters of the era. In 1827 he exhibited Foundation of the Collège de Sorbonne around the year 1256 at the Salon – it had been commissioned for the church of the Sorbonne. In 1838 he exhibited Jesus Christ in the Sepulchre (cathédrale de Périgueux) and General Sitting of the Estates General on 23rd June 1789 (musée d'Amiens).

He also produced The Death of Adonis, a stained glass window for the église Saint-Pierre-de-Chaillot (1843), The Virgin fainting] (1845), Jacob wrestling with the angel (cathédrale d'Avranches, 1851) and Clytie dying (musée de Picardie à Amiens, 1853). He won a first class medal in 1838 and in 1840 was decorated. He was finally made a member of the Institut, where he succeeded Eugène Delacroix in 1863. He died in 1869 in Paris.

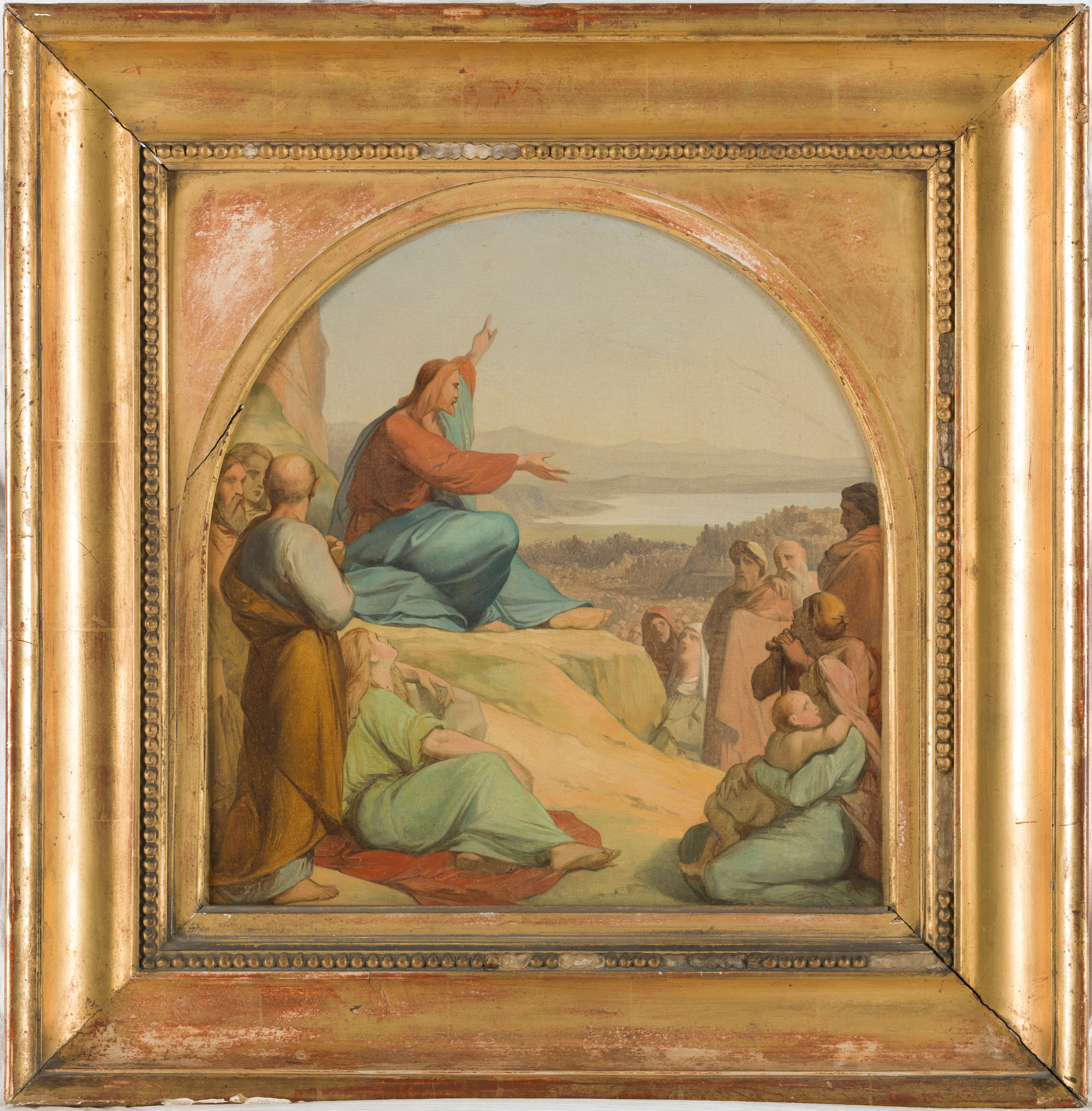
The sermon on the mount, 1849

== Works ==
- Amiens : Sitting of the Estates General, Clytie dying.
- Dijon : Original Sin
- Lisieux : Allegorical figure of the Republic.
- Paris, musée du Louvre : The Virgin fainting.
- Pontoise : Sainte Barbe, Head of an old woman.
- Troyes : Portrait of François Girardon, sculptor.
- Beaune, Musée des beaux-arts de Beaune: Original sin

== Bibliography ==
- (in French) Dictionnaire Bénézit, Dictionnaire des peintres, sculpteurs, dessinateurs et graveurs, vol. 7, éditions Gründ, janvier 1999, 13440 p. (ISBN 2700030176), p. 14
- (in French) Gérald Schurr, Valeurs de demain. Les petits Maîtres de la peinture 1820-1920, vol. 7, éditions de l'Amateur. Paris, 1982, 1120 p. (ISBN 2859173781)
