= Fonds national d'art contemporain =

- Location within France
- Former name: Bureau des travaux d'art
- Established: 1878
- Location: 70 voie des sculpteurs, La Défense, Paris, France
- Coordinates: 48.889411°N 2.244559°E
- Type: Museum of contemporary art

The Fonds national d'art contemporain (FNAC; National Foundation for Contemporary Art) is a public collection of contemporary art in France. It does not hold exhibitions but acquires and stores works of art that it loans to museums, cultural institutions and temporary exhibitions in France and abroad. It is the largest collection of contemporary art in France.

== Collection ==
FNAC is little-known, but is the largest collection of living art in France. As of 2014 it had 70,000 works of visual art, photography, decorative art and design. The FNAC has its origins in the Bureau des travaux d'art (Office of Art Works) created in 1878, which became the FNAC in 1976. In 1981 it became the responsibility of the Délégation aux arts plastiques of the French Ministry of Culture. It supports creation of art through acquisition of the work of living artists, and disseminates the work. As well as purchasing work by established artists, it tries to discover new creations of young artists. The FNAC adapts to contemporary trends and is open to diverse artistic approaches.

FNAC stores its collection in a 4,500 square metres (48,000 sq ft) facility under the Esplanade de la Défense. The Centre national des arts plastiques (CNAP) manages the collection. Information on the collection is maintained by Videomuseum. FNAC does not exhibit the works, which are meant to be placed on deposit or loaned to museums and cultural institutions, or loaned to exhibitions in France and abroad. Every year almost 2,000 items are loaned for temporary displays in France or abroad, including thematic exhibitions, solo exhibitions, retrospectives and so on. The FNAC takes care of packaging, transportation, ensuring a suitable environment in the place of exhibition, and restoration.

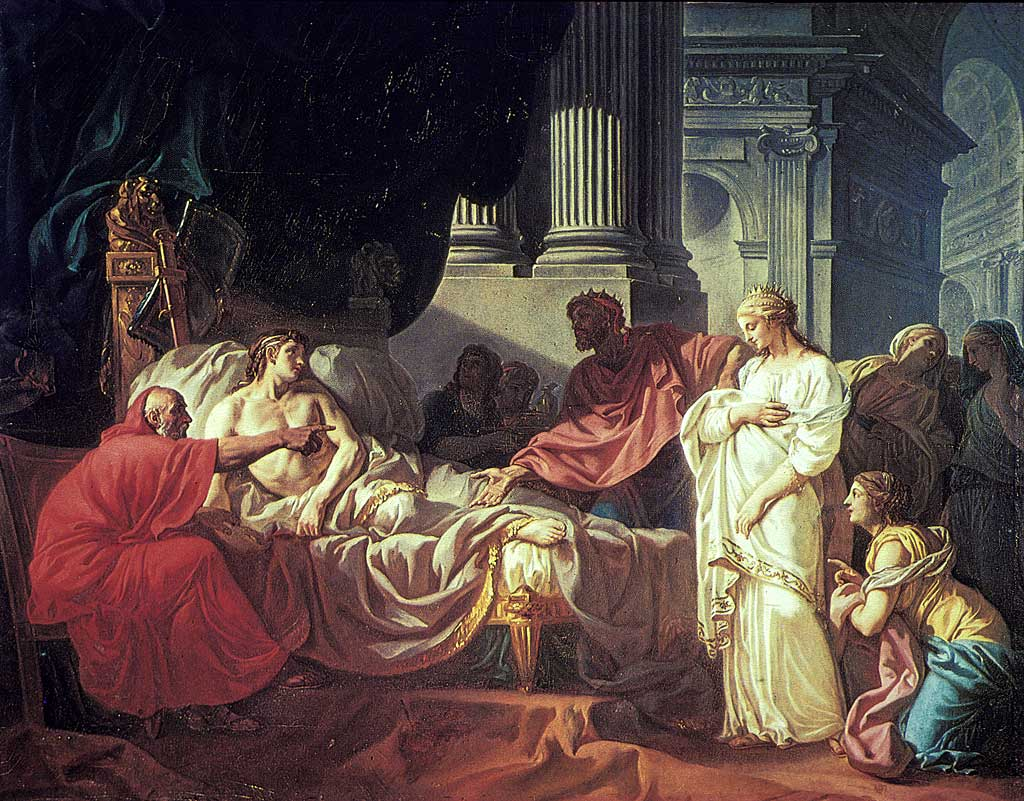
Jacques-Louis David, Erasistratus Discovering the Cause of Antiochus' Disease, 1774.

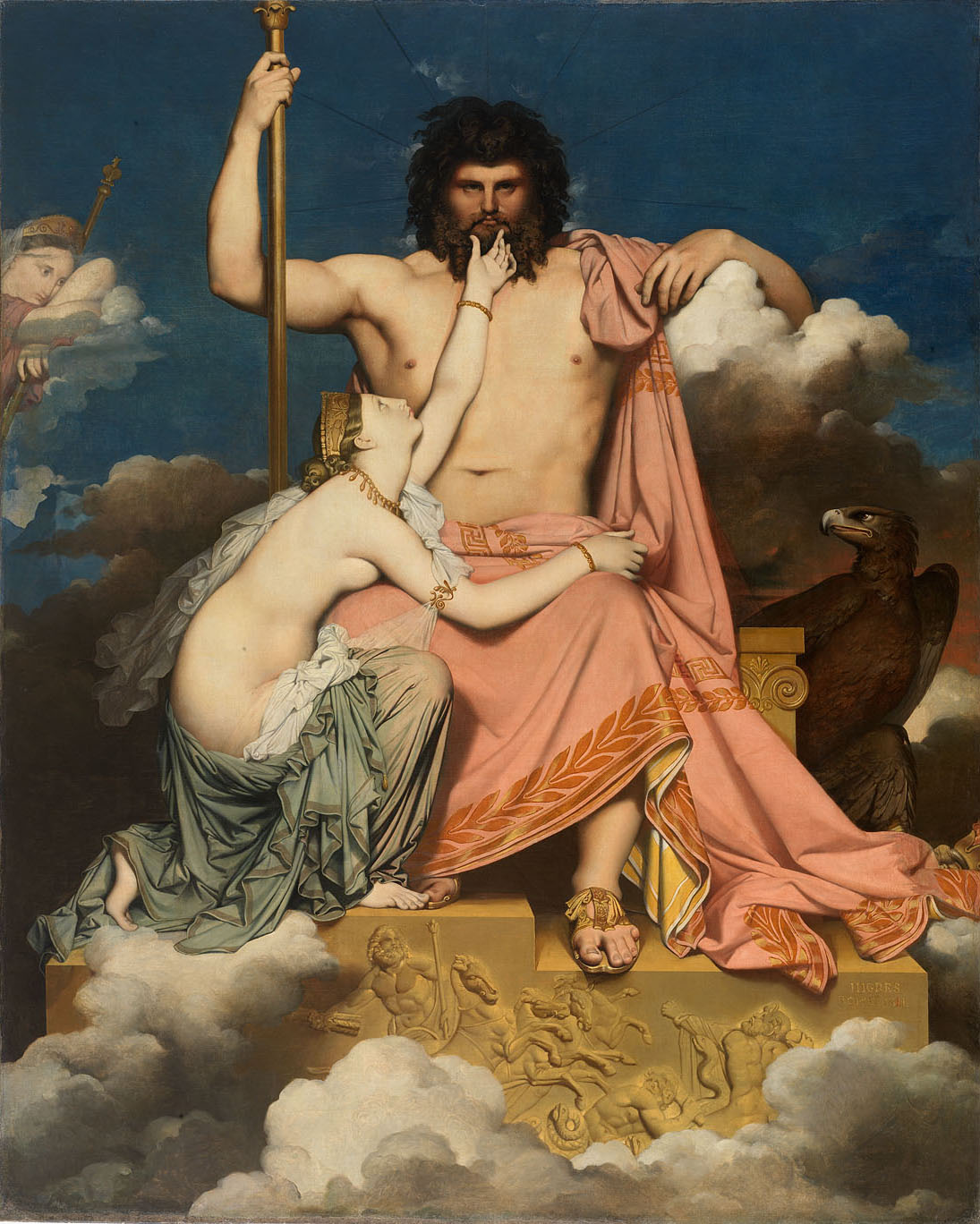
Jean-Auguste-Dominique Ingres, Jupiter and Thetis, 1811.

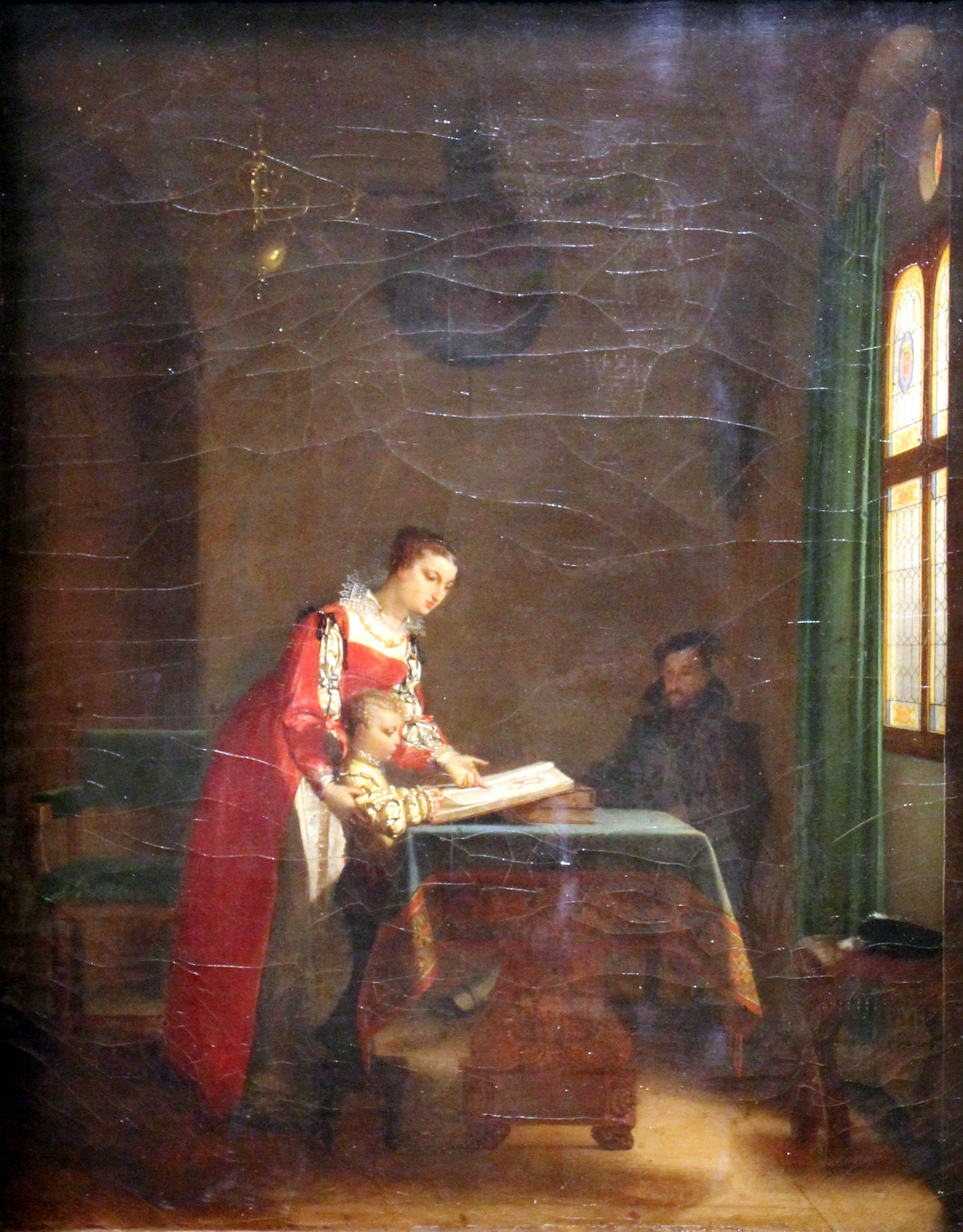
Jean-Baptiste Mallet, L'Éducation d'Henri IV, 1817.

Jean-Auguste-Dominique Ingres, The Vow of Louis XIII, 1824.

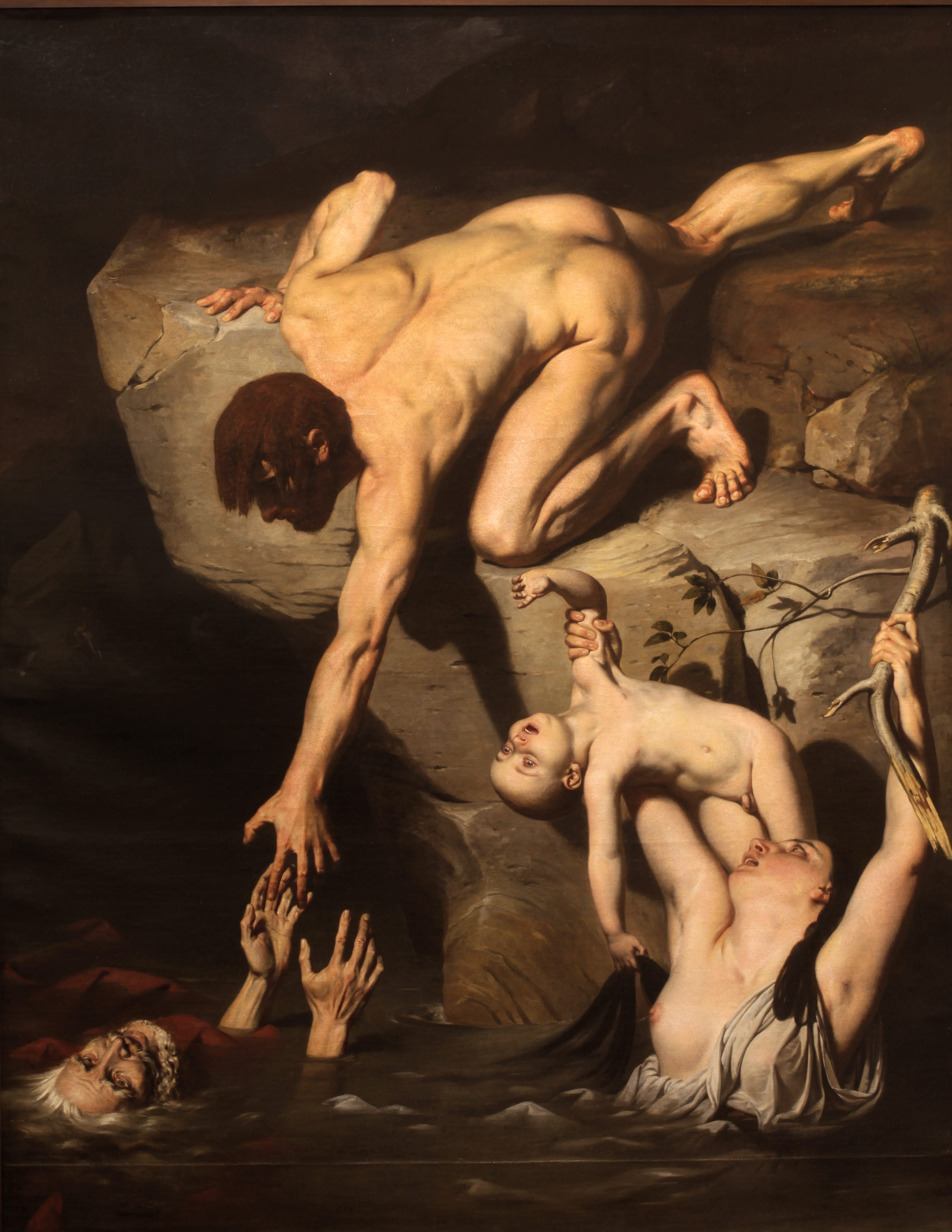
Joseph-Désiré Court, Scene from the Great Flood, 1826.

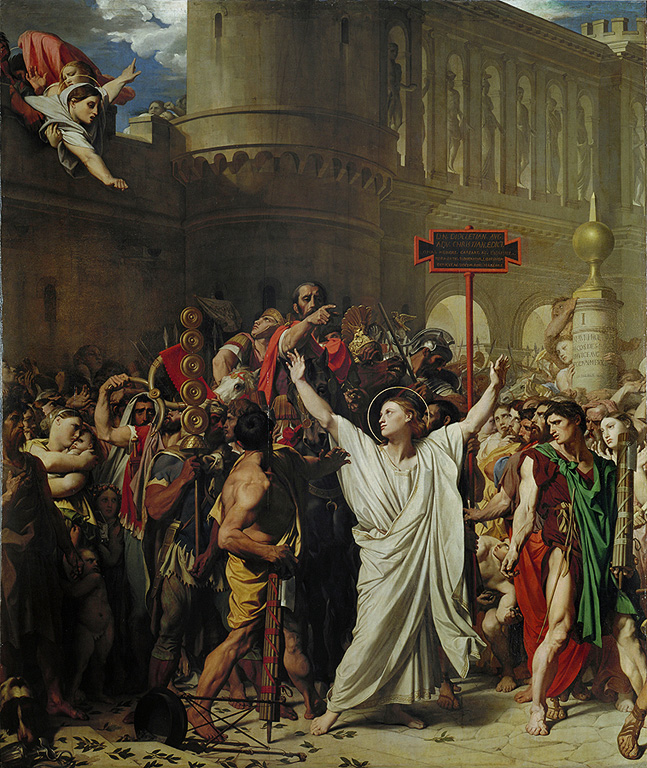
Jean-Auguste-Dominique Ingres, The Martyrdom of Saint Symphorian, 1834.

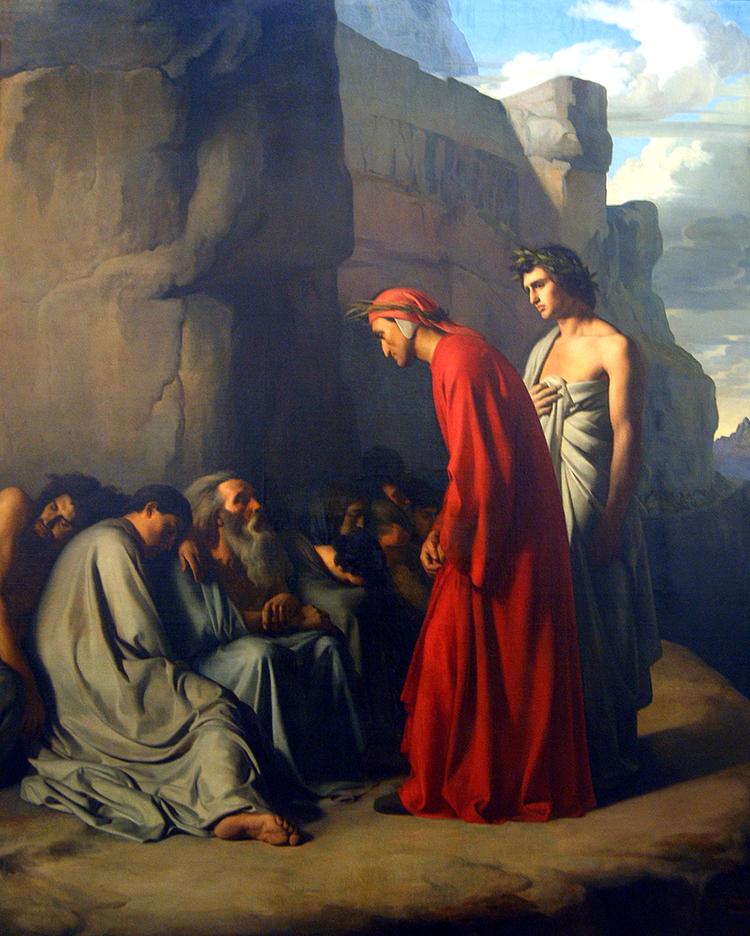
Hippolyte Flandrin, Dante in Hell, 1835.

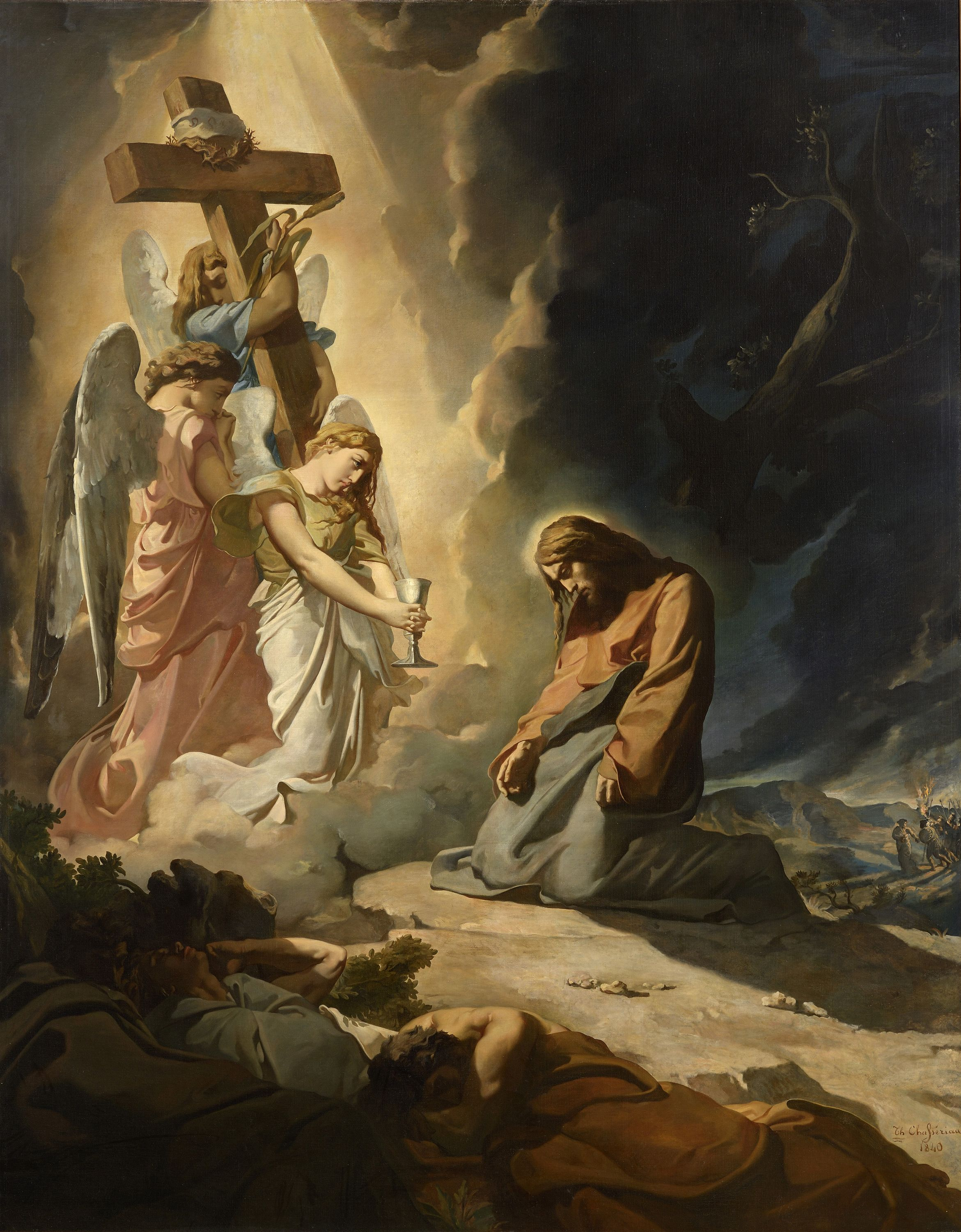
Théodore Chassériau, Christ in the Garden of Olives, 1840.

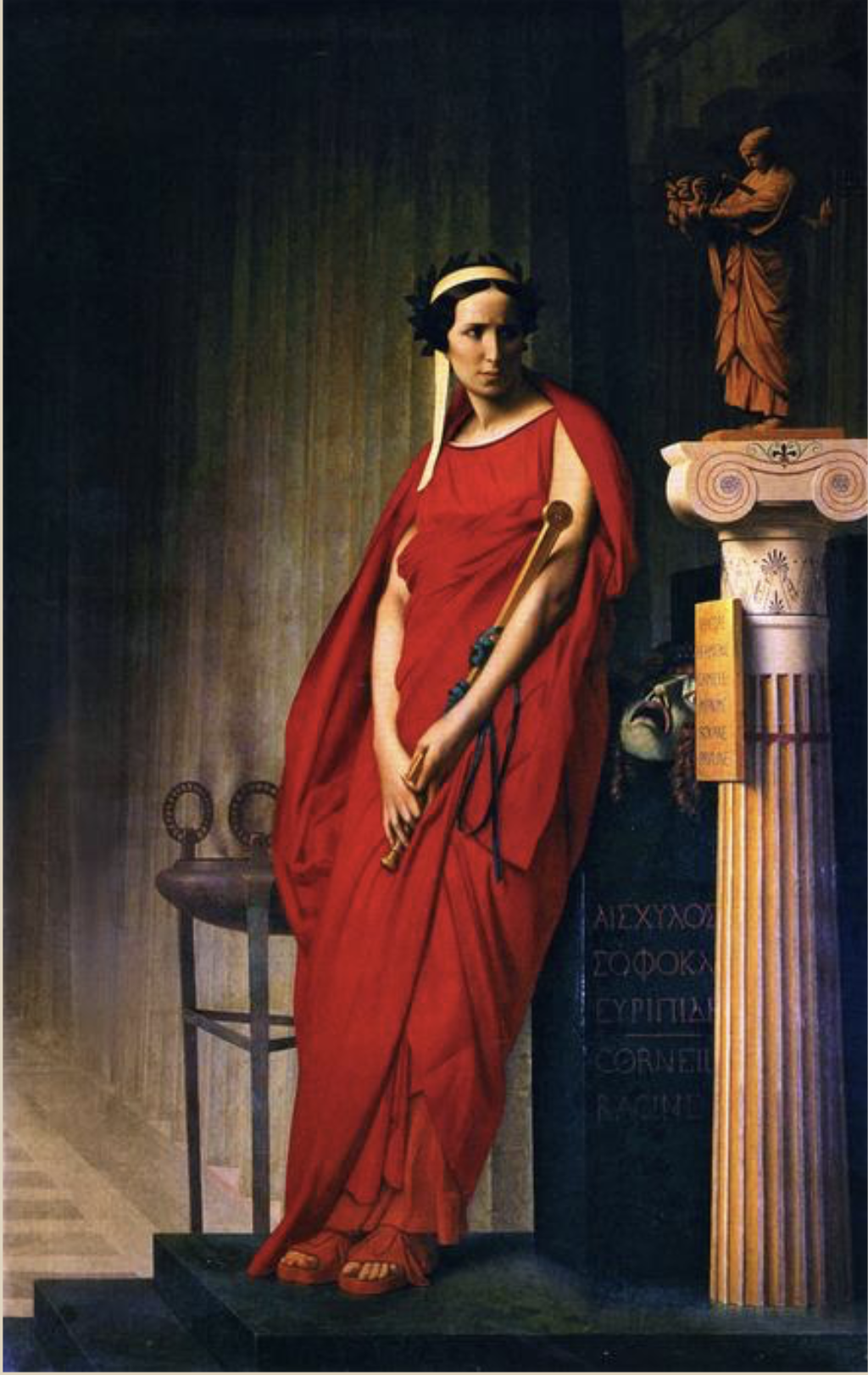
Jean-Léon Gérôme, Rachel, « La Tragédie », 1859.

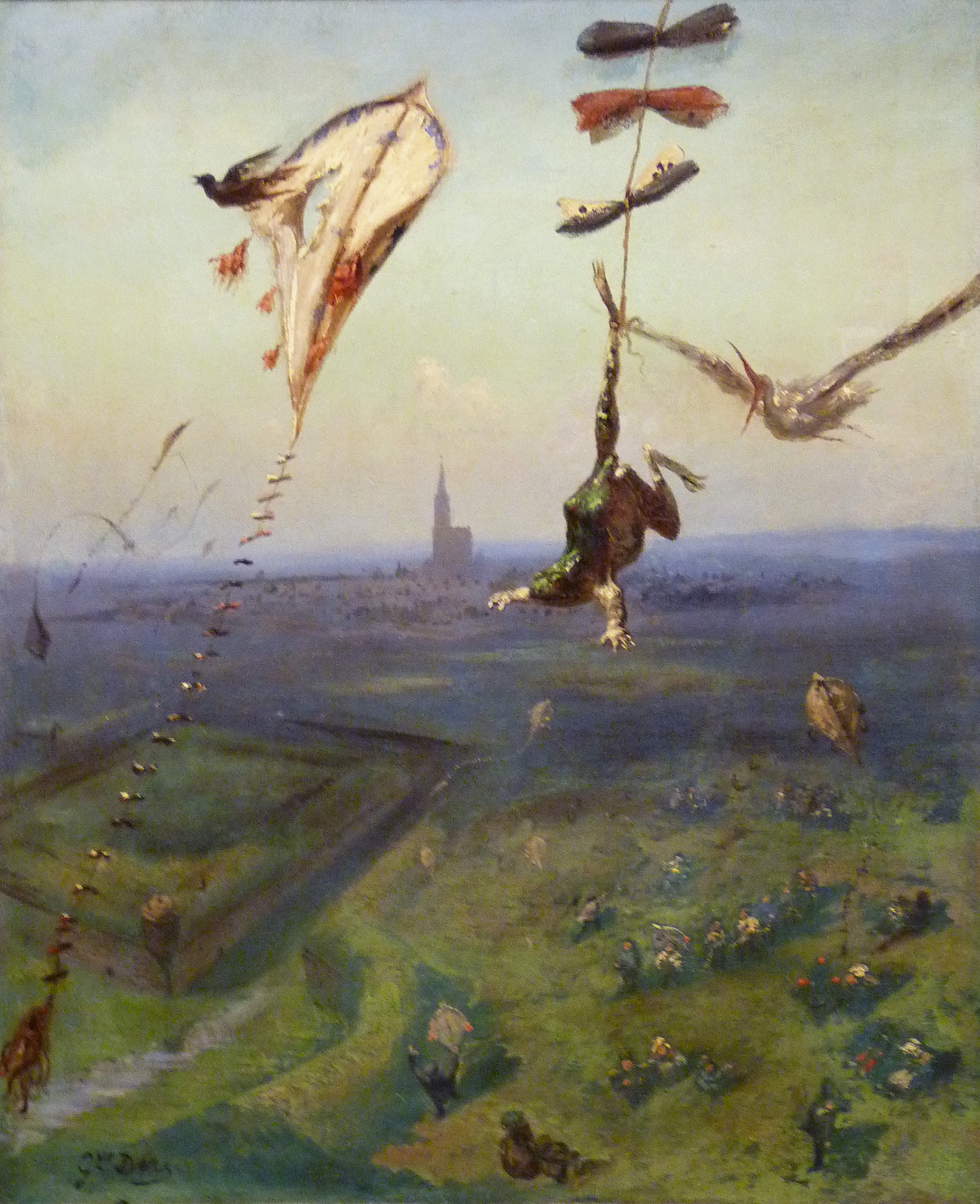
Gustave Doré, Entre ciel et terre, 1862.

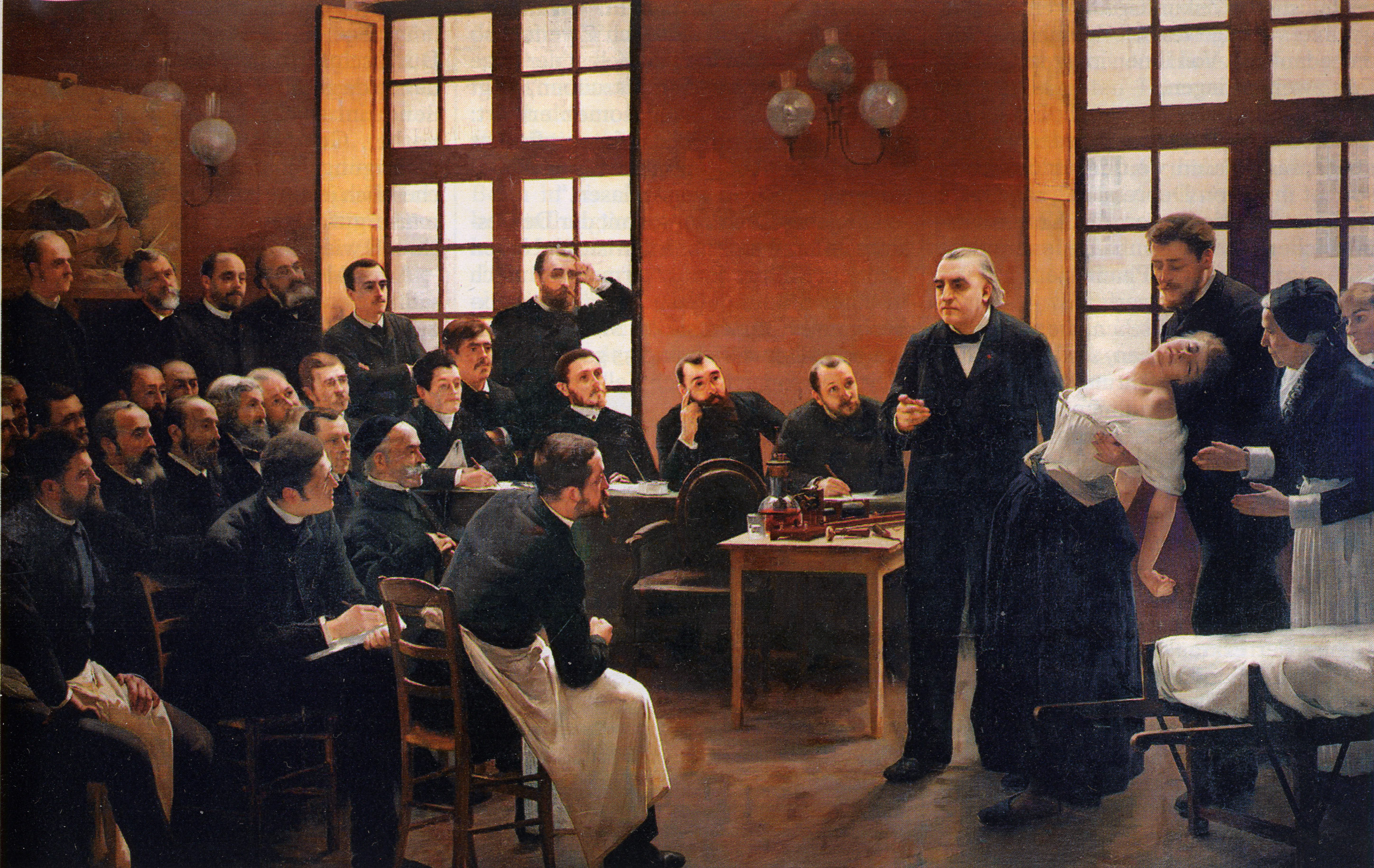
André Brouillet, A Clinical Lesson at the Salpêtrière, 1887.

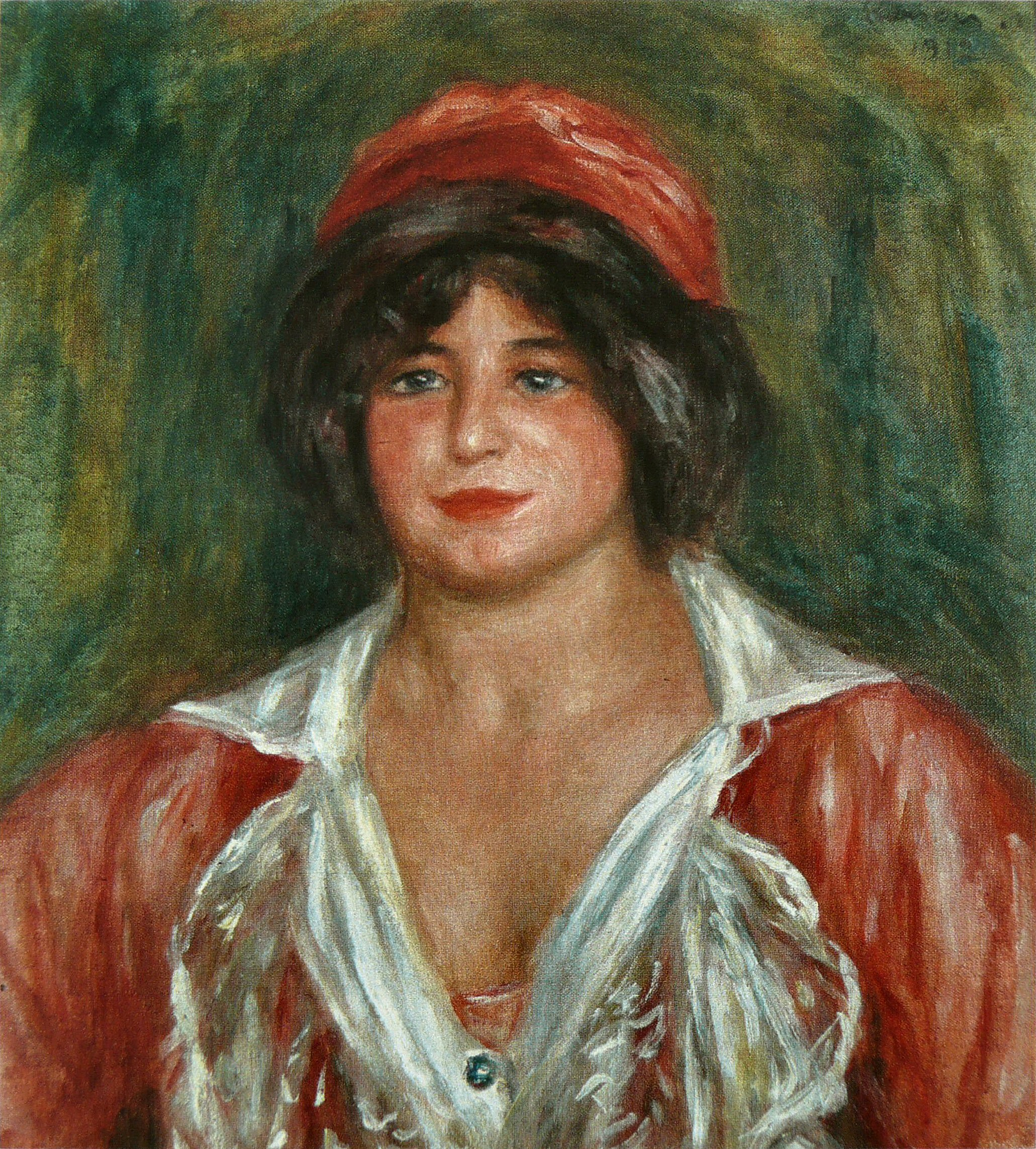
Auguste Renoir, Portrait de Colonna Romano, 1912.

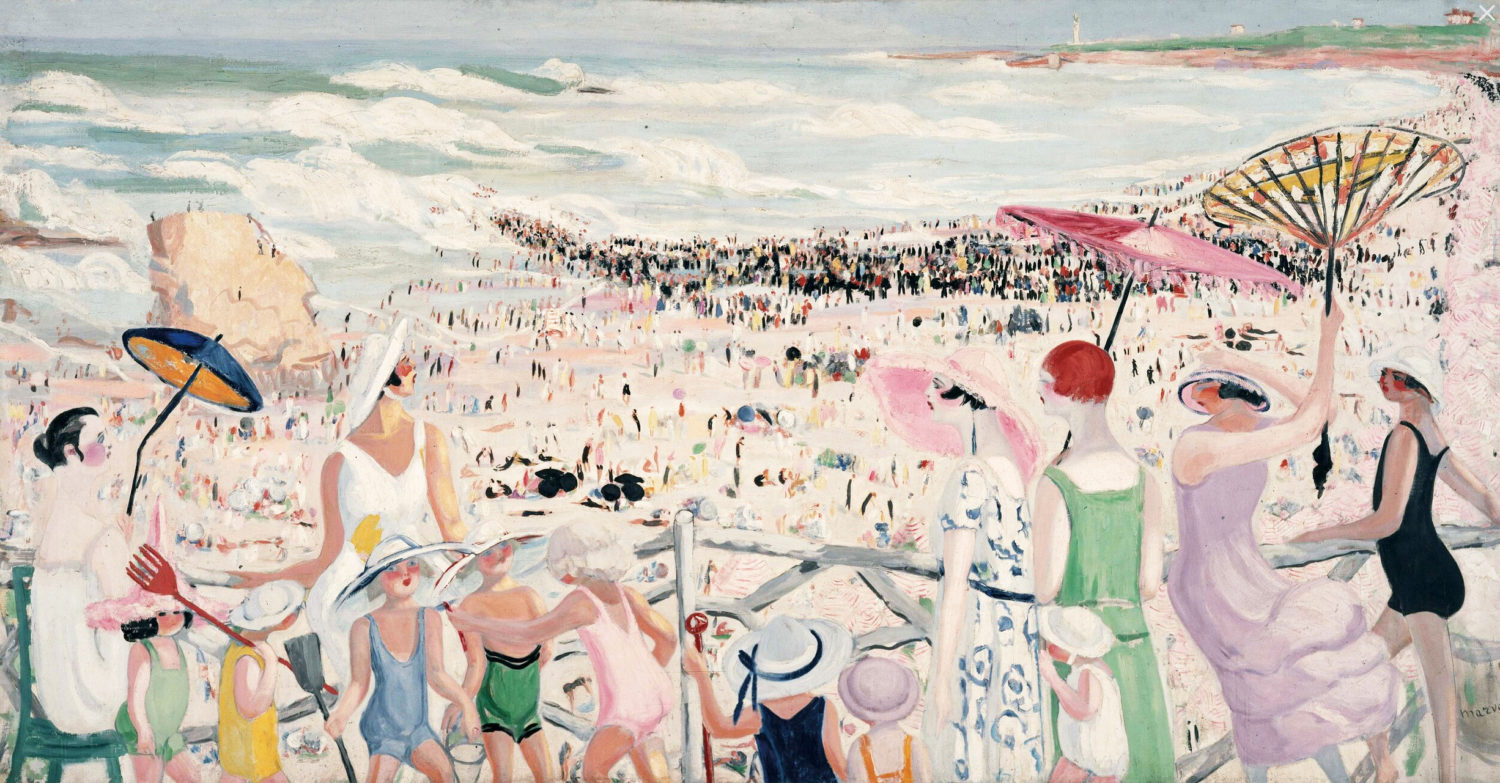
Jacqueline Marval, La Grande Plage à Biarritz, 1923.

== Acquisition process ==
Between 1981 and 2014 about 9,000 works by 3,500 different artists have been acquired by the FNAC. FNAC buys 600 to 1,000 new works each year. Purchasing recommendations are made by a commission of members of the arts community, including critics, collectors, artists, and representatives from the Ministry of Culture. The commission meets several times each year to review requests for acquisitions made by artists or galleries. Artists must not have sold their work to the state for two years, and only one nomination is allowed every two years unless specifically requested by the commission. The works are acquired by specialized committees for visual arts, photography, decorative art and design. Members are appointed by the Minister of Culture for three-year terms.

== Sources ==
- "Fonds national d'art contemporain (FNAC)" (in French). Ministry of Culture.
- "Le FNAC Fonds National d'Art Contemporain". SODA: Soluble dans l'air (in French). TV5 Monde. Archived from the original on 2014-12-08.
- "Qu'est-ce que videomuseum ?" (in French). Videomuseum.
