= Portrait of Napoleon III =

Portrait of Napoleon III may refer to:

- Portrait of Napoleon III (Cabanel)
- Portrait of Napoleon III (Flandrin)
- Portrait of Napoleon III (Winterhalter) - 1853, First Picture
