= Seated Young Shepherd =

Painting by Hippolyte Flandrin

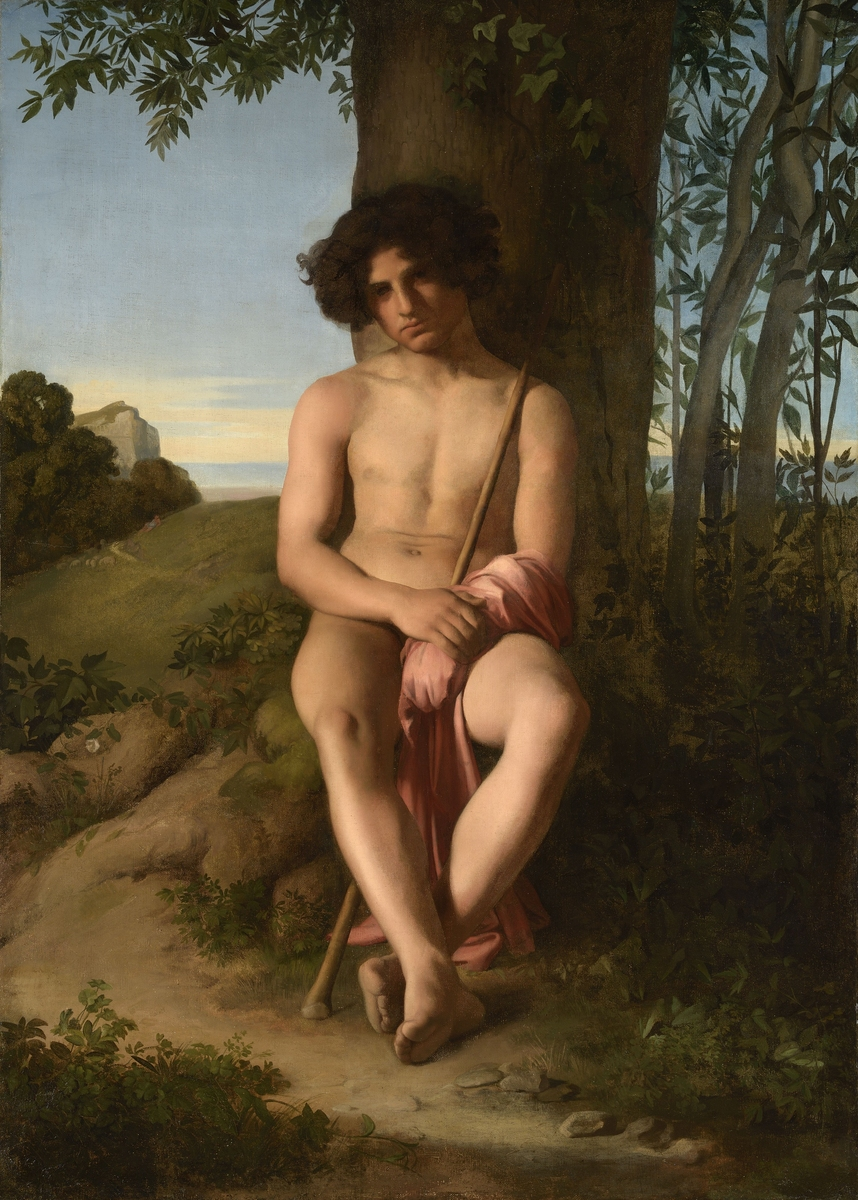
- Artist: Hippolyte Flandrin
- Year: 1834
- Medium: Oil on canvas
- Dimensions: 174 cm × 125 cm (69 in × 49 in)
- Location: Museum of Fine Arts of Lyon, Lyon

Seated Young Shepherd is an oil-on-canvas painting by the French artist Hippolyte Flandrin, executed in 1834, now in the Museum of Fine Arts of Lyon, which acquired it in 2012.

== History and description ==
The Italian model who posed for this painting is found in other Flandrin compositions, while the landscape is undoubtedly imaginary, and the painting was probably painted in the studio.

The painting presents a naked young man, with black hair, bowed head, and nonchalant attitude, seated at the foot of an imposing tree trunk. Presented as a shepherd, with a vigorous and muscular body, he holds a shepherd's staff between his legs, while his orange-colored cloak is wrapped around his left arm. In the background to the left stretches a rural landscape made up of scanty vegetation, while can be seen a flock of sheep with another shepherd lying on the ground, and a cliff, all under a pale blue sky.

== Analysis ==
Flandrin was known for his interest in the eroticism of the male nude forms. The current work has been described as a celebration of male beauty. The visual grammar of the painting accentuates the young man's (albeit hidden) genitals. In fact, the layout of the diagonals that are created in the panorama guide the viewer's gaze right towards the boy's groin, which is located exactly in the center of the picture. The virility of the subject is hidden by the cloak, but the sensuality of the work is nevertheless accentuated by the languid pose of the model and by the phallic symbols of the rod and the trunk.
