= Portrait of Napoleon III (Flandrin) =

Painting by Hippolyte Flandrin

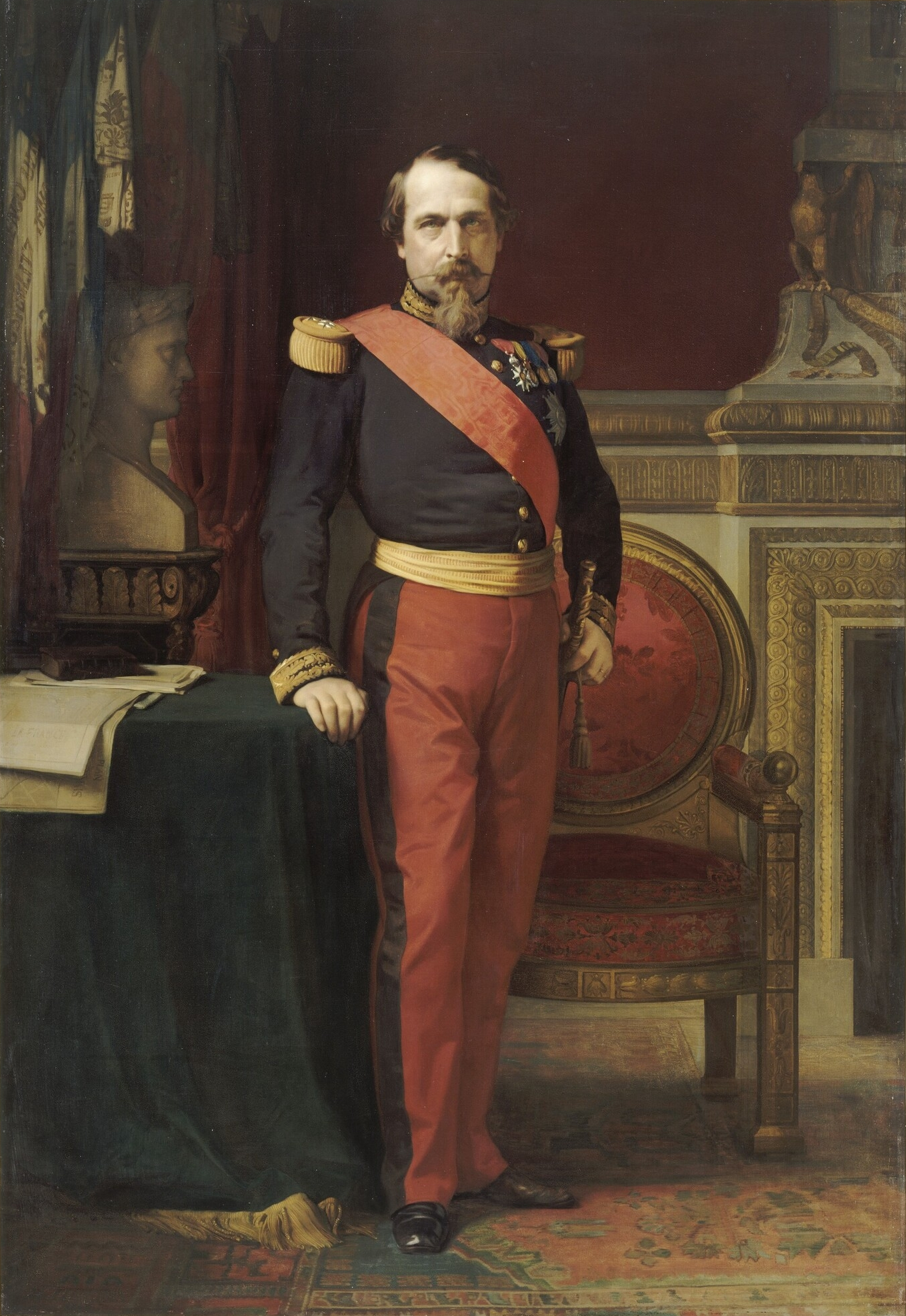
- Artist: Hippolyte Flandrin
- Year: 1861
- Medium: Oil on canvas
- Dimensions: 212 cm × 147 cm (83 in × 58 in)
- Location: Musée de l'Histoire de France; Paris

Portrait of Napoleon III (initially called in French Portrait de S. M. l'Empereur, 'Portrait of His Majesty the Emperor') is an oil painting of 1861 by the French painter Hippolyte Flandrin, depicting France's Emperor Napoleon III standing in his Grand Cabinet. It is held at the Musée de l'Histoire de France, in Paris. At its first presentation in the Universal Exhibition in 1862, the painting attracted praise for its true-to-life representation of Napoleon III.

In 1853, the newly-appointed Emperor of the French Napoleon III commissioned Jean-Hippolyte Flandrin, a pupil of Jean-Auguste-Dominique Ingres and specialized painter of religious figures, to work on a standing portrait of him. The Emperor, displeased by Flandrin's depiction of him, cancelled the commission, and preferred Franz Xaver Winterhalter's painting of him in his coronation robes, with its more glorified and distinguished idealization. Reinstated in 1861, Flandrin recommenced work on his portrait, incentivized by a retrospective commission of 20,000 francs.

According to Karine Huguenaud, Flandrin's portrait is a "penetrating psychological study of the emperor", extraordinarily capturing Napoleon III's "distant and inscrutable look". Standing in his Général de Division uniform, Napoleon III is depicted in the Grand Cabinet at the Tuileries Palace amidst pointed attributes: a marble bust of Napoleon Bonaparte, crowned with laurel, over his right shoulder and a Napoleonic eagle in the background. On his desk are French maps and a copy of Julius Caesar's Commentarii de Bello Gallico. "This", exulted writer Théophile Gautier, "is without doubt the first 'real' portrait which we have of Your Majesty", referring to the realistic approach in Flandrin's work.

The Portrait of Napoleon III was first shown at the 1862 Universal Exhibition in London, on donation from the Emperor. Flandrin's painting was a standout wherever it was exhibited: the Universal Exhibition, Paris Salon (1863), at the Paris Ecole des Beaux-Arts (1864), and the Paris Exposition universelle (1867). The critics were positive: the sincerity of the subject exercised both intimacy and fascination, winning favor over Winhalter's coronation portrait. By 1884, Flandrin's painting was returned to the French government and displayed in the Palace of Versailles.
