= Portrait of Madame Oudiné =

Painting by Hippolyre Flandrin

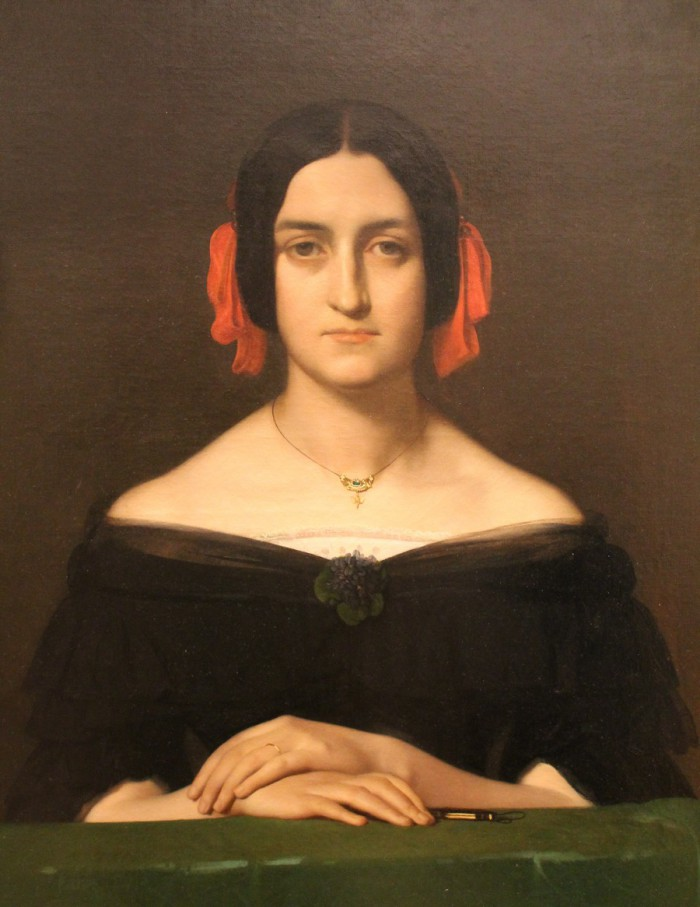
- Artist: Hippolyte Flandrin
- Year: 1840
- Medium: Oil on canvas
- Dimensions: 84 cm × 64 cm (33 in × 25 in)
- Location: Musée des Beaux-Arts de Lyon, Lyon

Portrait of Madame Oudiné is an oil-on-canvas painting by the French artist Hippolyte Flandrin, executed in 1840, now in the Musée des Beaux-Arts de Lyon.

== History ==
It depicts the young wife of Eugène Oudiné, one of Flandrin's fellow painters at the Villa Medici. It was the first portrait Flandrin painted after his return from Rome and he produced it after a relatively short time lapse. It was successfully exhibited at the Paris Salon of 1840. According to Patrice Béghain, the painting seems intended to symbolize bourgeois virtue as every element emphasizes "nothing but order, stiffness and symmetry".

== Description ==
The painting presents a woman seen from the front. Her brown hair is carefully ordered by a parting in the middle, while a red ribbon hangs from either side of her hairstyle. Her nose is straight, the lips tight, and she gazes towards the viewer very seriously. The woman is dressed in a black dress topped with a white lace wimple, leaving her shoulders bare, while a bouquet of violets is hanging in the middle of her chest. Around her neck shines a gold necklace ending with an emerald pendant and an eagle. The woman's hands are resting on top of each other on the ledge of a theater box, with a wedding ring highlighted adorning the ring finger of her left hand, while the other hand partially covers a theater bezel.

== Sources ==
- Patrice Béghain, Inconnues célèbres. Regards sur trente portraits du musée des Beaux-Arts de Lyon, Stéphane Bachès.
