= Dante in Hell =

Painting by Hippolyte Flandrin

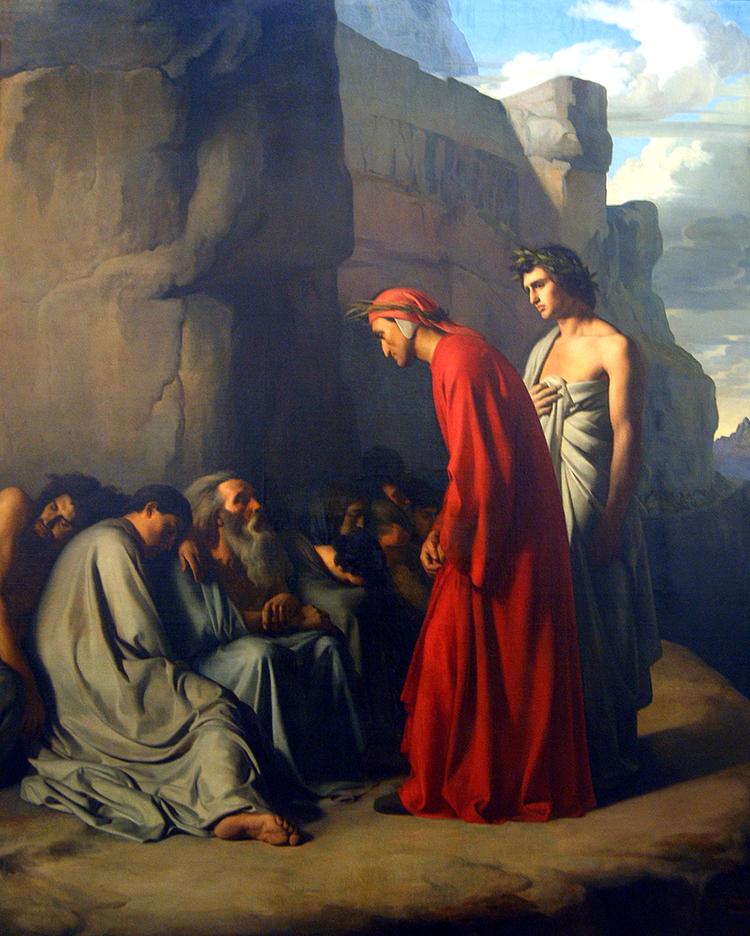
- Artist: Hippolyte Flandrin
- Year: 1835
- Medium: Oil on canvas
- Dimensions: 295 cm × 245 cm (116 in × 96 in)
- Location: Musée des Beaux-Arts de Lyon, Lyon

Dante in Hell or Dante, led by Virgil, Consoles the Souls of the Envious is an 1835 oil painting on canvas by the French painter Hippolyte Flandrin. Contrary to its primary title, it shows a scene from the Circle of the Envious, the second circle of Purgatory in Canto III of Purgatorio. The scene depicts Dante on the mountain of Purgatorio trying to comfort the blind men. It is now in the Museum of Fine Arts of Lyon.

== Sources ==
- Lansing, Richard H. (1993). "Purgatorio III". Lectura Dantis (12): 35–52. JSTOR 44806522. This source analyzes the third canto of Purgatorio.
- "Flandrin family." Grove Art Online. 2003. Oxford University Press. Date of access 10 Dec. 2020, This article focuses on the Flandrin family. Contains a long portion about Jean-Hippolyte Flandrin and his artistic career. Highlights his achievements and artistic focuses.
- Driskel, Michael Paul (1984). "Painting, Piety, and Politics in 1848: Hippolyte Flandrin's Emblem of Equality at Nîmes". The Art Bulletin. 66 (2): 270–285. doi:10.2307/3050417. JSTOR 3050417. This article is an in-depth look at Hippolyte Flandrin's career and specifically his downfall as an artist despite being one of Ingres’s most accomplished students.
- Lagrange, Léon, "Hippolyte Flandrin, sa vie et ses œuvres", in Le Correspondant, 11 Avril 1864, p745
