= Hippolyte Flandrin =

French painter (1809–1864)

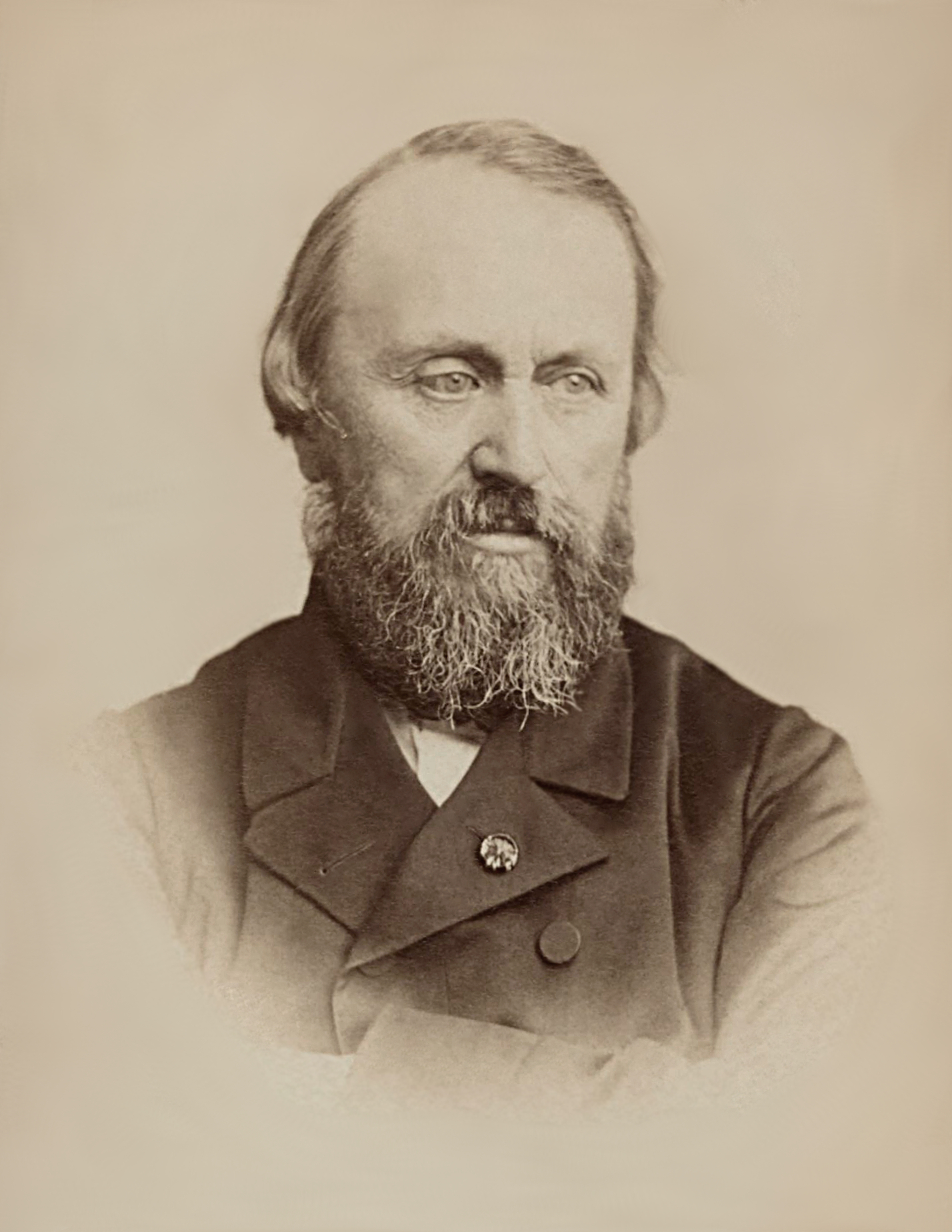
- Hippolyte Flandrin in a photograph by Charles Reutlinger (c. 1860)
- Born: 23 March 1809; Lyon, France
- Died: 21 March 1864 (aged 54); Rome, Italy
- Education: Pupil of Louis Hersent and Jean-Auguste-Dominique Ingres
- Known for: Painting
- Notable work: Jeune Homme Nu Assis au Bord de la Mer (1836)
- Movement: Neoclassicism
- Awards: Prix de Rome (1832)

Jean-Hippolyte Flandrin (23 March 1809 – 21 March 1864) was a French Neoclassical painter. His most celebrated work, Jeune Homme Nu Assis au Bord de la Mer (1836) is held in the Louvre.

== Biography ==
=== Early life ===
From an early age, Flandrin showed interest in the arts and a career as a painter. He was the second of three sons, all of whom were painters. Auguste, his older brother, spent most of his life as a professor at Lyon and later died there. Paul, his younger brother, was a painter of portraits and religious imagery.

Hippolyte and Paul spent some time at Lyon, saving to leave for Paris in 1829 and study under Louis Hersent. Eventually, they settled in the studio of Jean-Auguste-Dominique Ingres, who became not only their instructor but their friend for life. In 1832, he won the Prix de Rome for his painting Recognition of Theseus by his Father. This prestigious art scholarship meant that he was no longer limited by his poverty.

=== Career ===
The Prix de Rome allowed him to study for five years in Rome. While there, he created several paintings, increasing his celebrity both in France and Italy. His painting St. Clair Healing the Blind was created for the Nantes Cathedral, and years later, it also brought him a medal of the first class at the exhibition of 1855; this painting was destroyed in the fire which took place at Nantes Cathedral on 18 July 2020. Jesus and the Little Children was given by the government to the town of Lisieux. Dante and Virgil visiting the Envious Men struck with Blindness and Euripides writing his Tragedies are now in the Museum of Fine Arts in Lyon.

In 1853, Flandrin was elected to the Académie des Beaux-Arts. On 4 April 1856, he assisted in the founding of the Œuvre des Écoles d'Orient, better known as L'Œuvre d'Orient; he was a member of its first general council on 25 April 1856. Upon his return to Paris in 1856, Flandrin received a commission from the chapel of St John in the church of St Séverin. As a result, his reputation became even more impressive, virtually guaranteeing him continuous employment for the rest of his life.

In addition to these works, Flandrin also painted a great number of portraits, including Portrait of Napoleon III, who was not very well received by the sitter. However, he is much more known today for his monumental decorative paintings. The most notable of these are found in the following locations:

- in the sanctuary, choir, and nave of St Germain des Prés at Paris (1842–1861)
- in the church of St Paul at Nîmes (1848–1849)
- of St Vincent de Paul at Paris (1850–1854)
- in the church of St-Martin-d'Ainay at Lyon (1855)

=== Personal life and death ===
In 1843 Flandrin married Aimée-Caroline Ancelot (1822–1882). Their son Paul Hippolyte Flandrin (1856–1921) became a painter of sacred art, portraitist and decorator.

In 1863, Flandrin's failing health, made worse by his hard work and extended exposure to the damp and draughts of churches, induced him to visit Italy again, where he died of smallpox in Rome on 21 March 1864.

== Main works ==
- Portrait of Madame Oudiné, 1840 (Musée des Beaux-Arts de Lyon).
- Study (Young Male Nude Seated Beside the Sea), 1836 (Louvre Museum)
- Dante in Hell, 1835 (Musée des beaux-arts de Lyon).
- Seated Young Shepherd, 1834 (Musée des beaux-arts de Lyon).

== Gallery ==
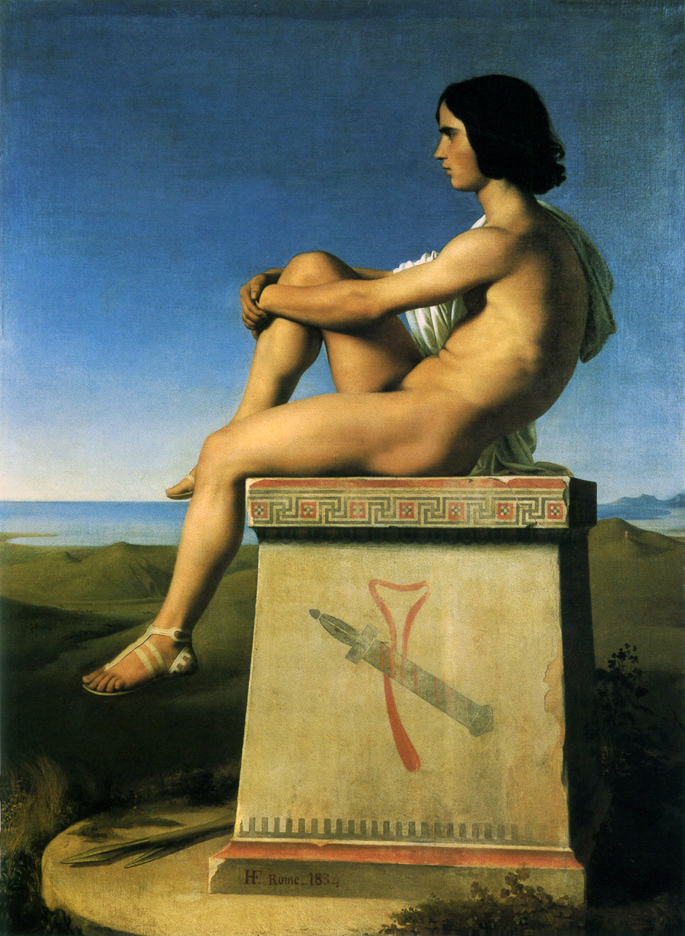
Polites, Son of Priam, Watching the Greek Movements (1833–34)

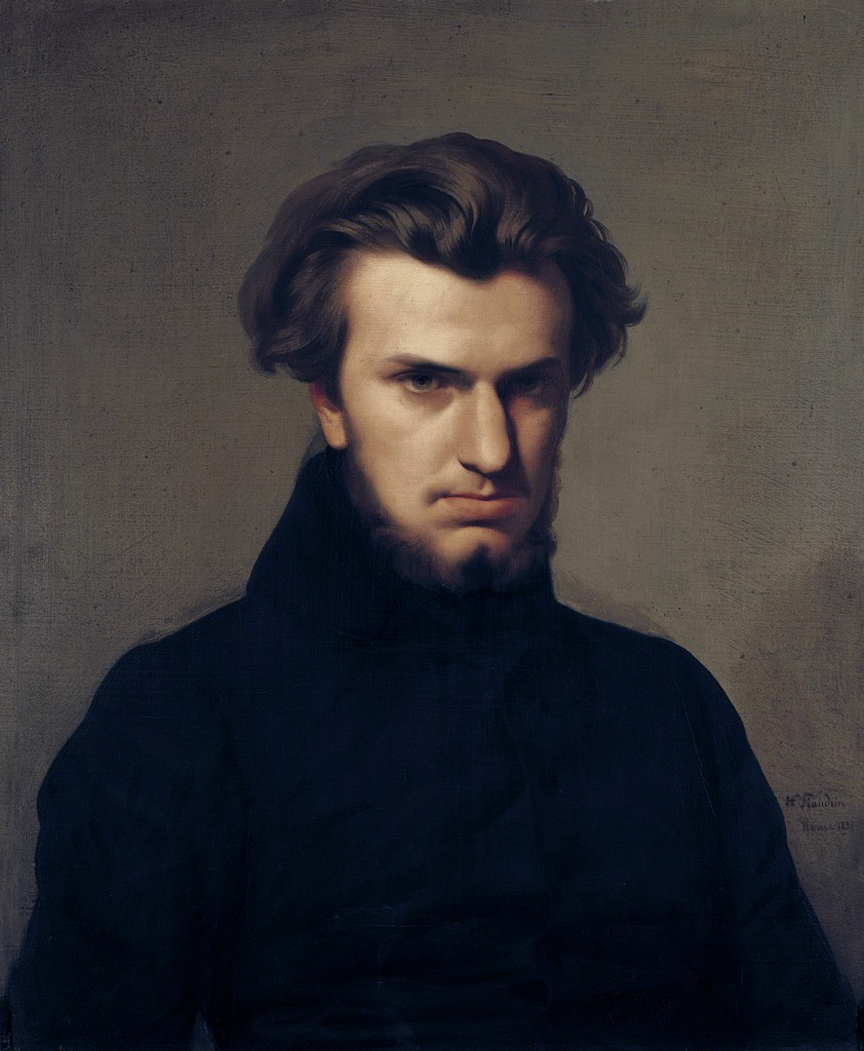
Ambroise Thomas (1834)

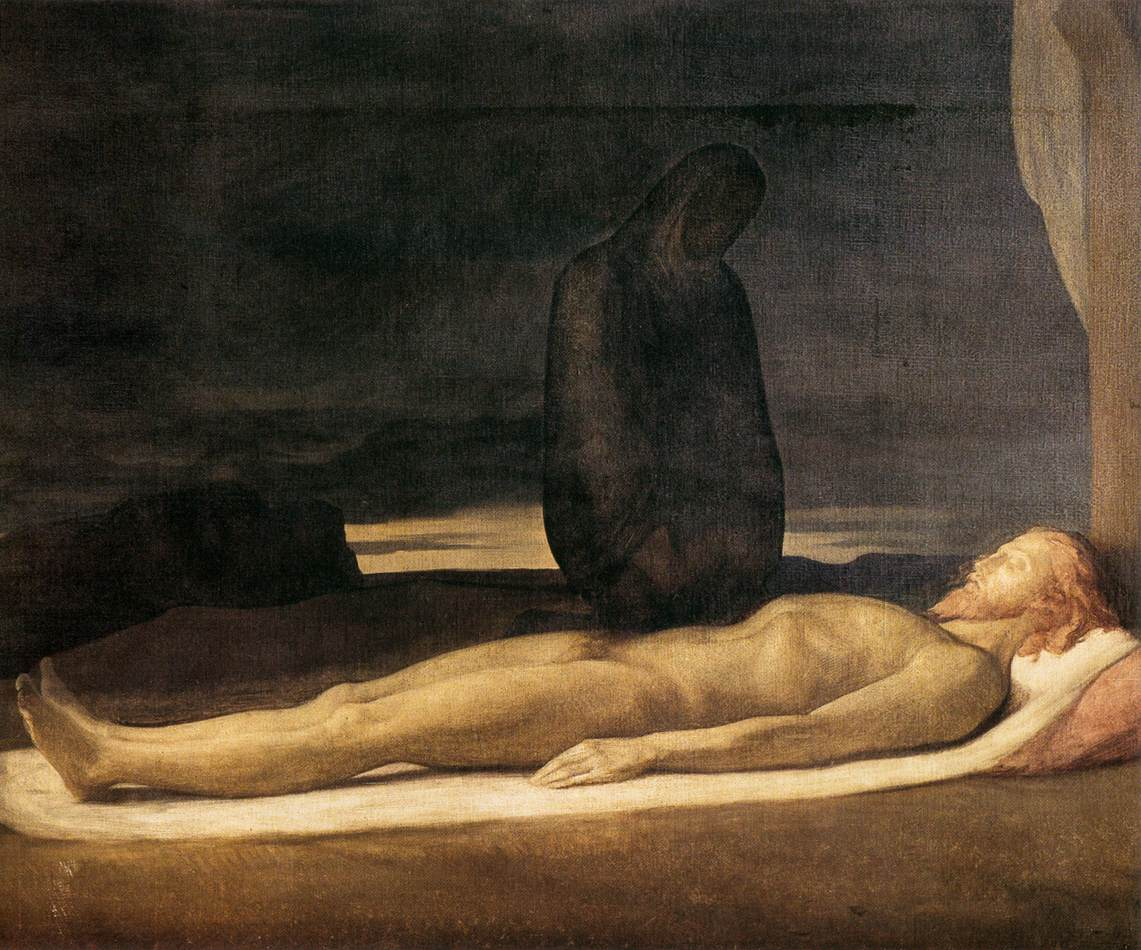
Pietà (c. 1842)

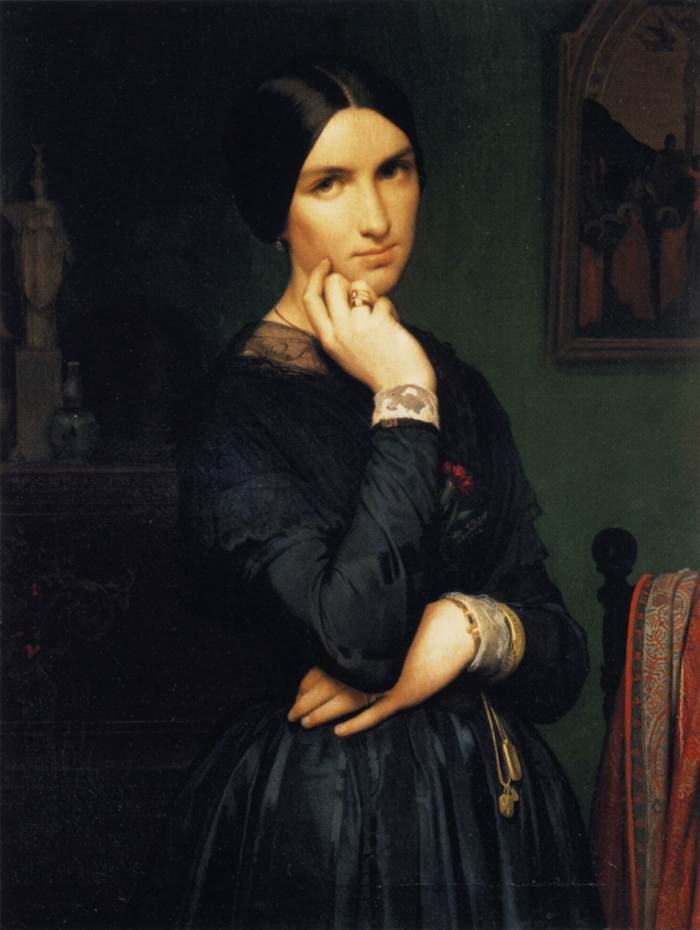
Madame Hippolyte Flandrin (1846)

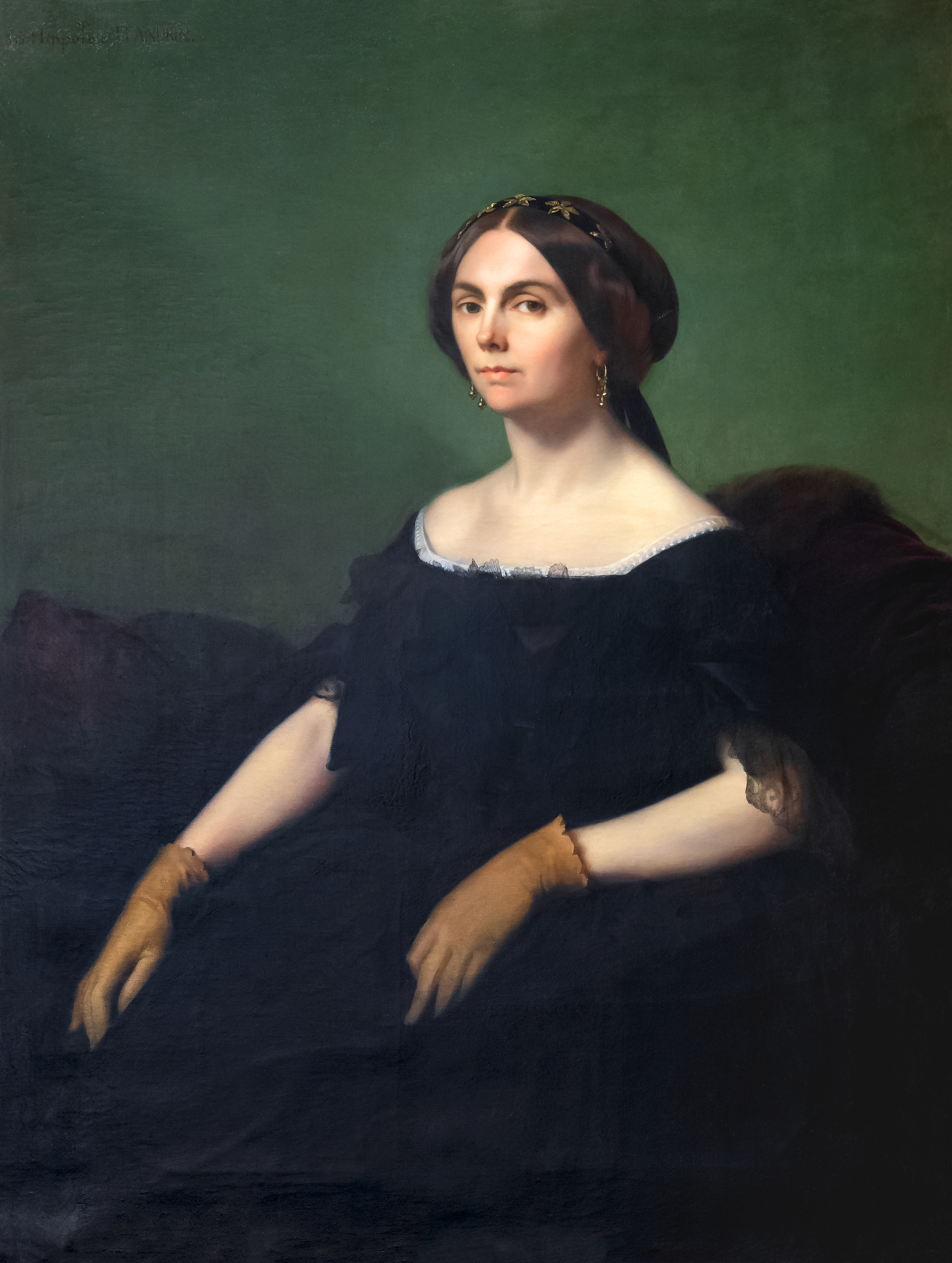
Countess of Goyon (1853)

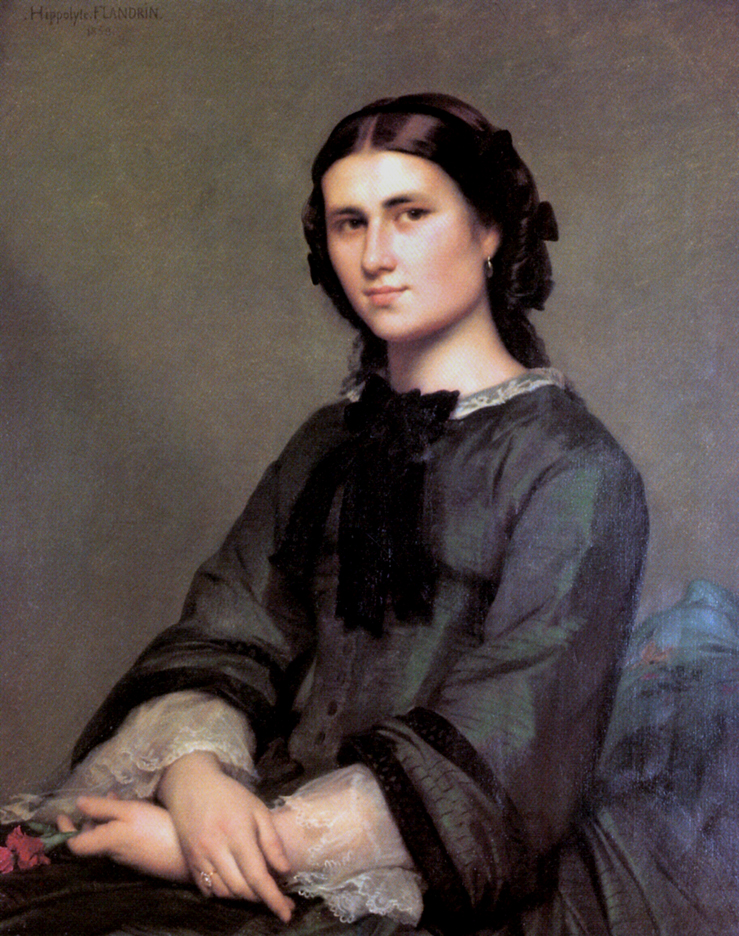
Mademoiselle Mathilde Maison (1858)

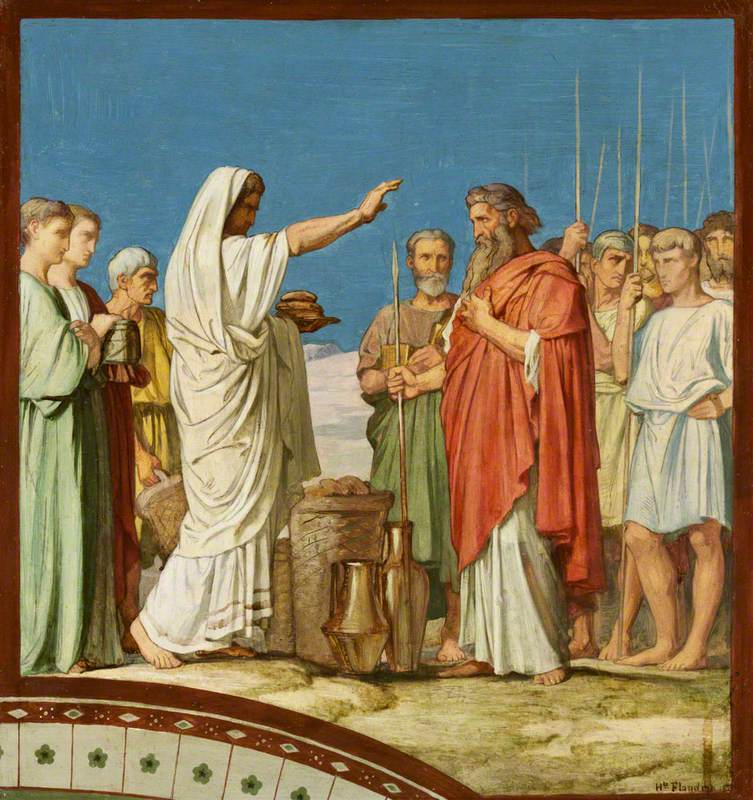
Melchizedek Blesses Abraham (1859)

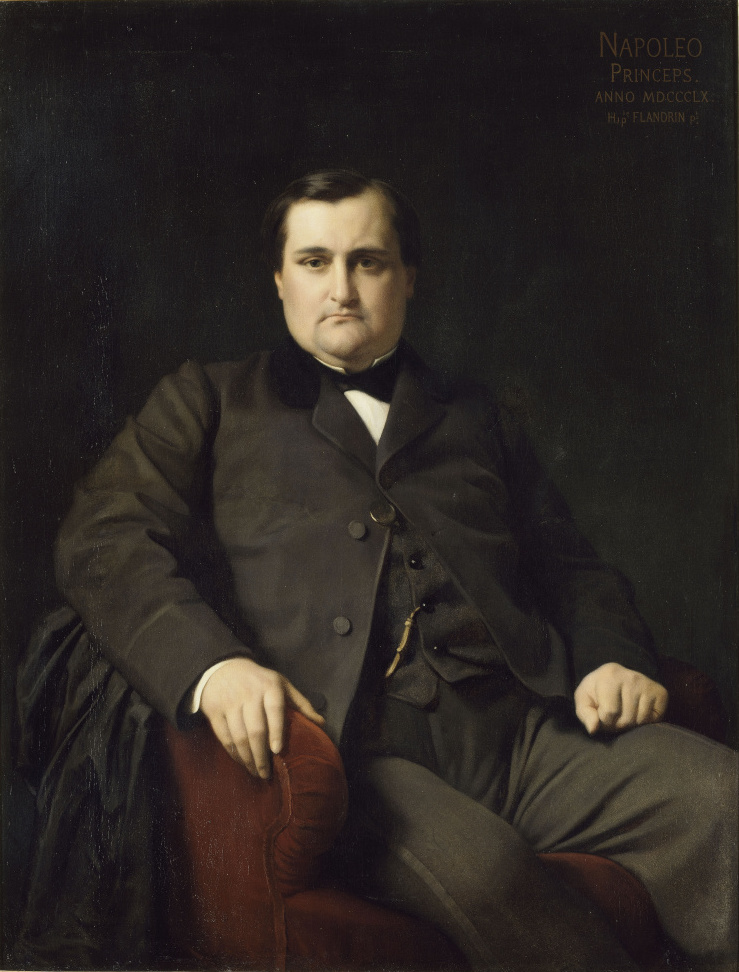
Joseph Charles Paul Bonaparte (1860)

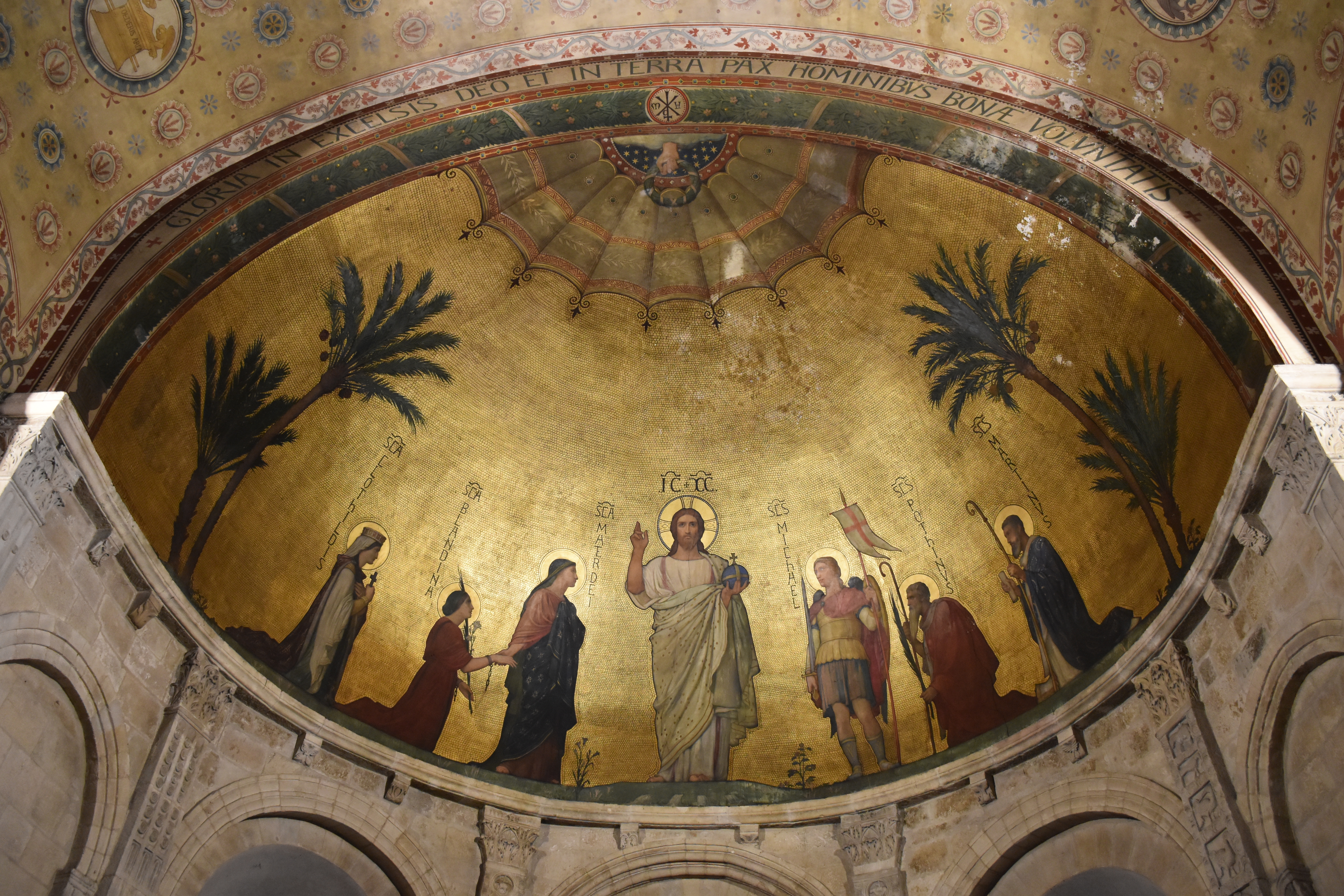
Christ with the Virgin, Saint Blandine, Saint Clotilde, Saint Michael the Archangel, Saint Pothin, and Saint Martin (1855) Basilica of Saint-Martin d'Ainay, Lyon.

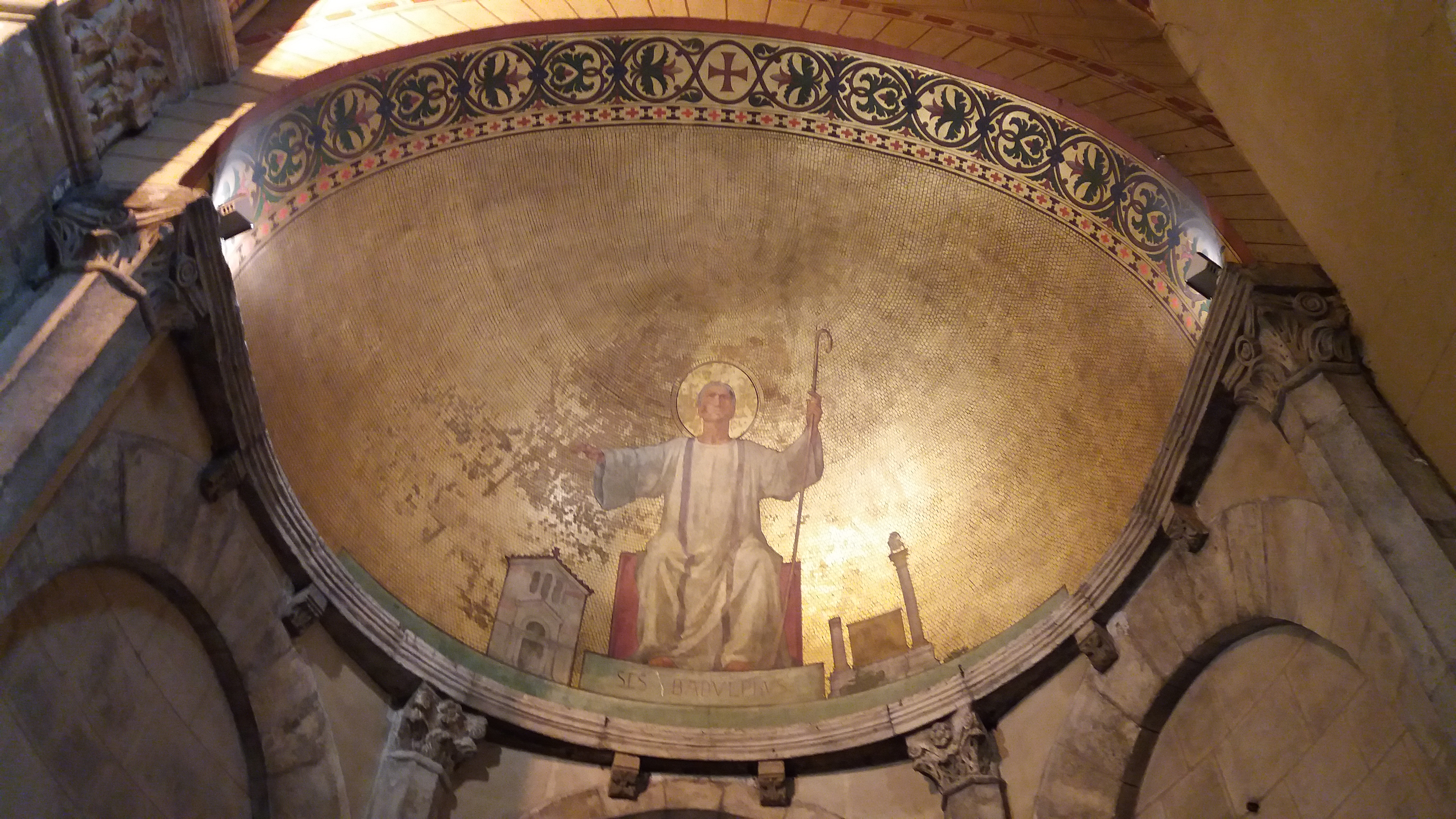
Saint Badulphe

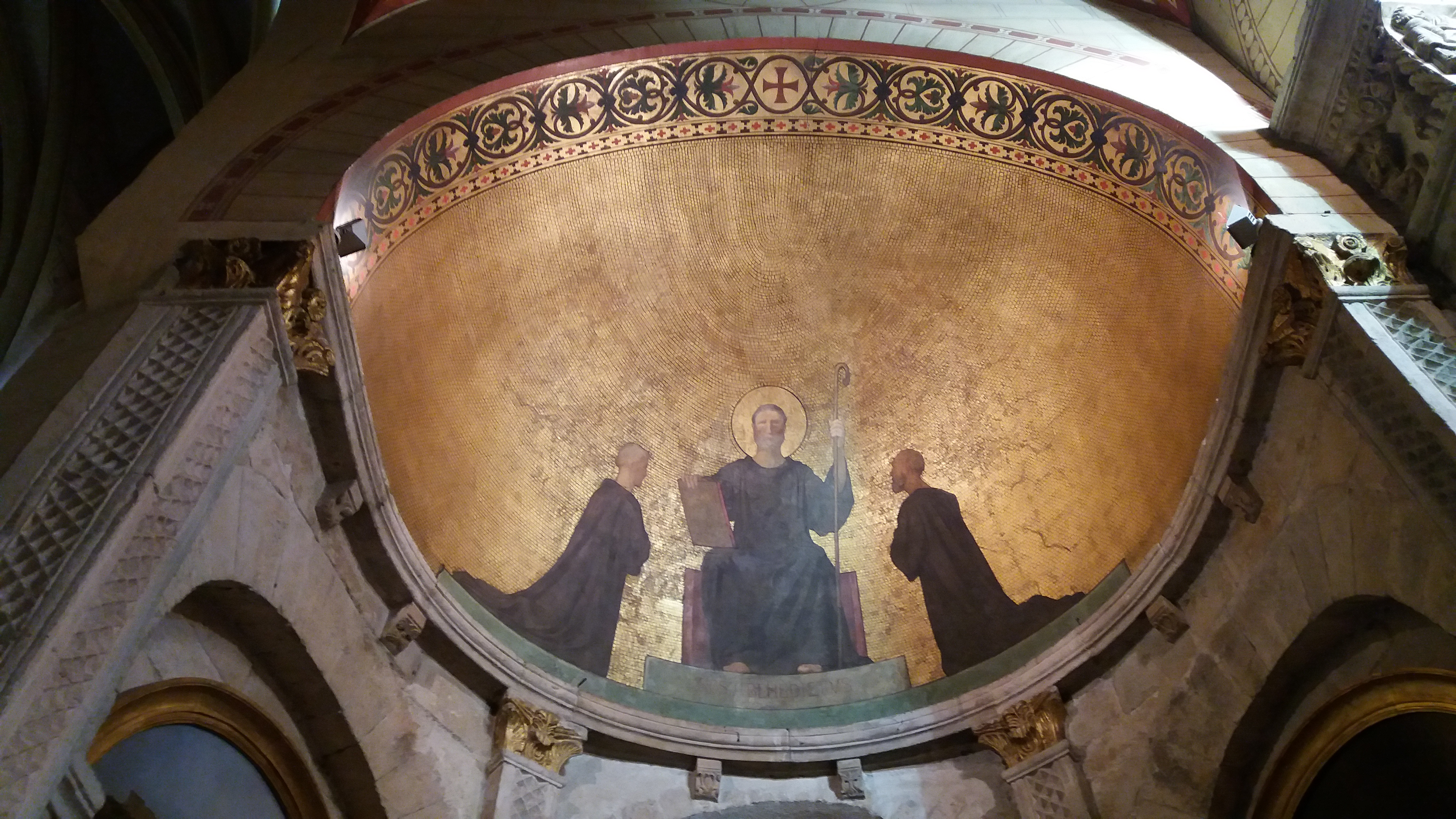
Apsidiole
