= Jean-Baptiste Mallet =

French painter

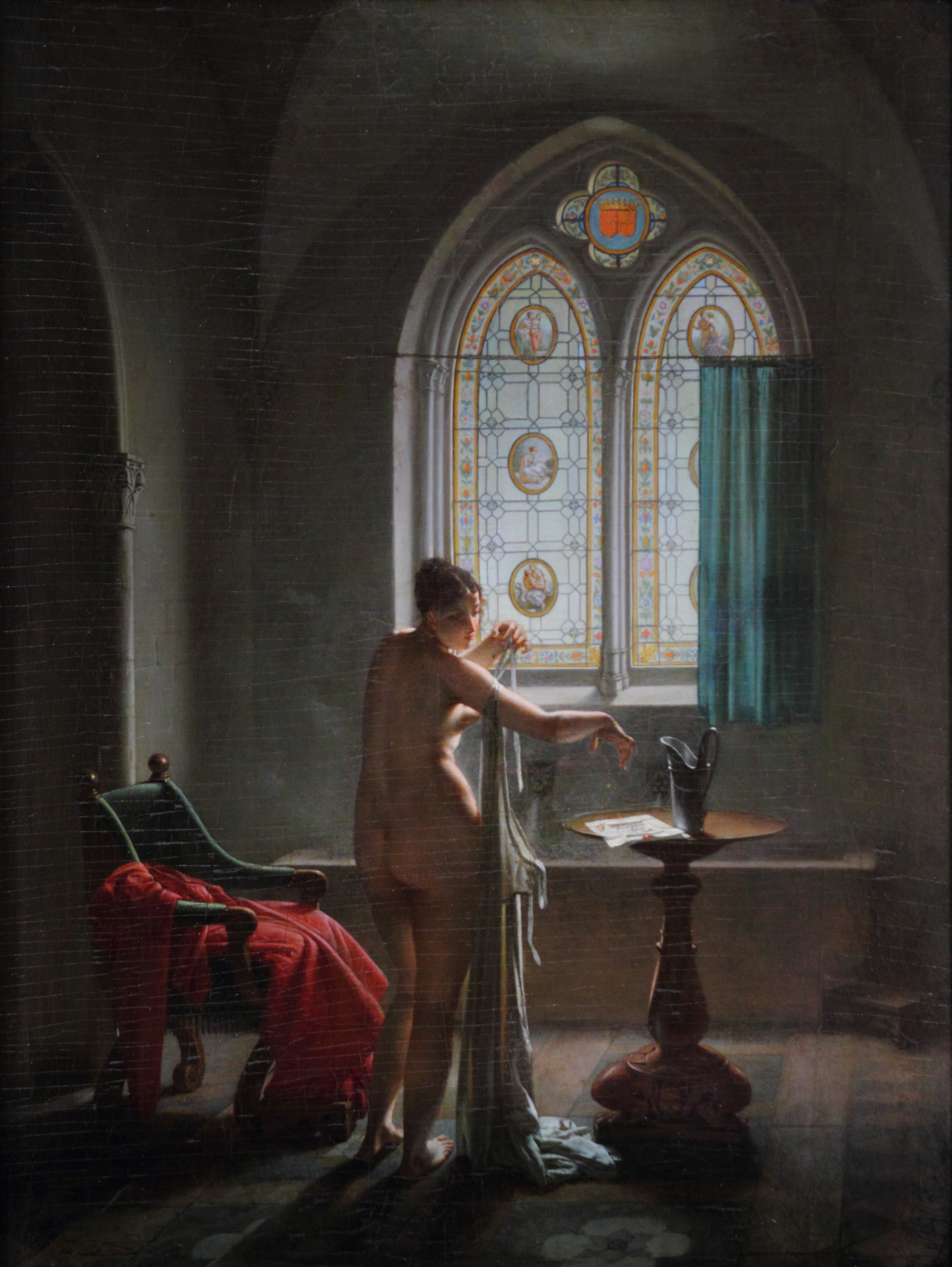
Gothic Bath Room

Jean-Baptiste Mallet (1759 – 16 August 1835) was a French painter in the Troubadour style.

== Life and work ==
He was born in Grasse. He originally studied with Simon Julien in Toulon, then with Pierre-Paul Prud'hon in Paris. His style shows the strong influence of Jean-Baptiste Greuze, Jean-Honoré Fragonard (also from Grasse) and Louis Léopold Boilly. He is also known to have studied 17th-century Dutch painting.

Most of his works were gouaches and watercolors, done in relatively small formats, and consist largely of genre scenes depicting life under the Directorate and the First Empire. In 1795, he was commissioned by Pierre Didot to provide illustrations for an edition of La Fontaine's Fables. Preparatory sketches were made, but never used.

He was an exhibitor at every Salon from 1793 to 1827; winning a second-class medal in 1812 and the first-class in 1817. He died in Paris in 1835.

His paintings were very popular and are an indispensable source of information about interior decorations and furnishings of the period. Most of his works were also available as prints.

Outside of France, his works may be seen at the National Gallery of Art and LACMA.
