= Scene from the Great Flood =

1826 painting by Joseph-Désiré Court

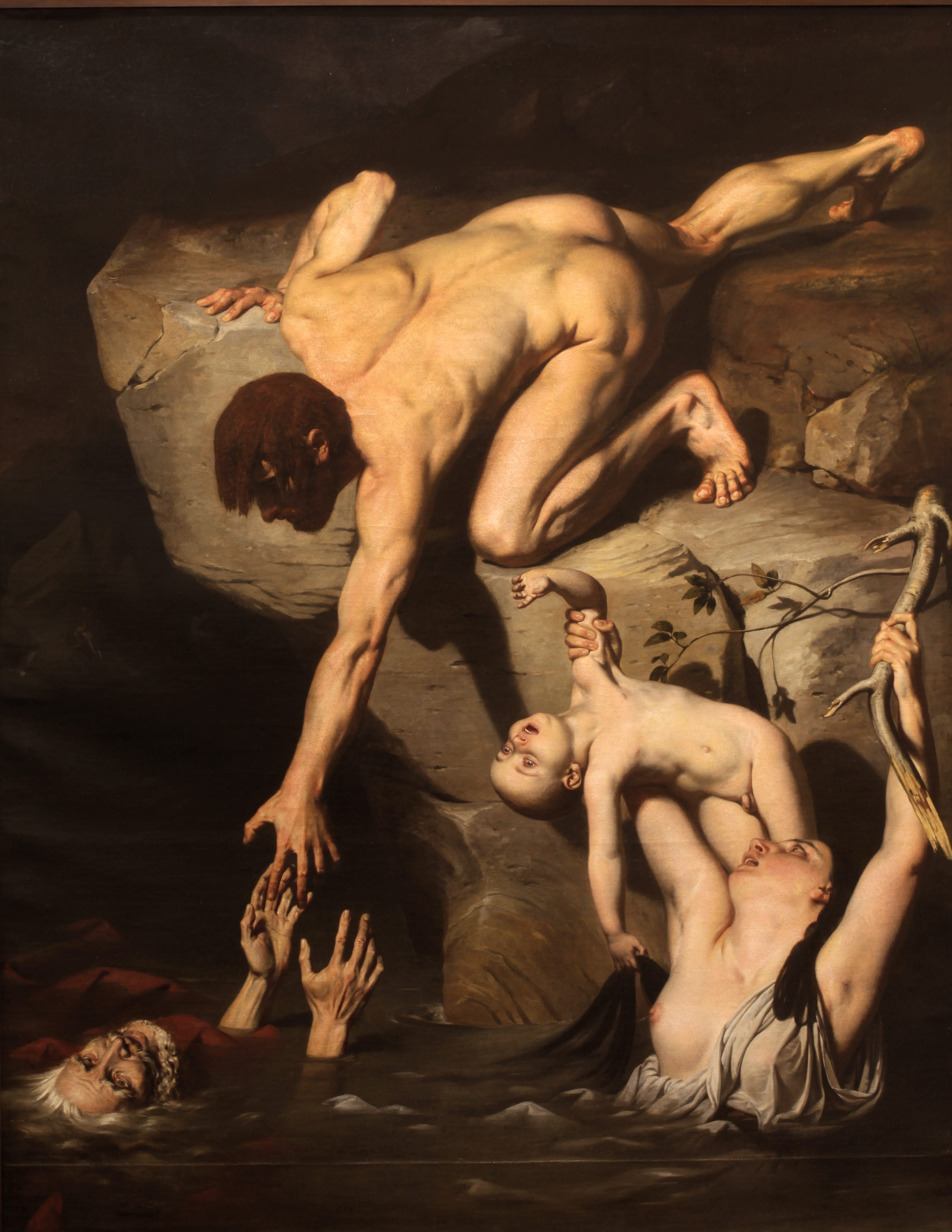
Scene from the Great Flood (1826), by Joseph-Désiré Court

Scene from the Great Flood or The Great Flood is an 1826 painting of Noah's flood by Joseph-Désiré Court. It was first exhibited at the Paris Salon of 1827 although - as a laureate of the Prix de Rome - he could not compete for the awards of that Salon. The French state purchased the work for 3000 francs and it is now in the Museum of Fine Arts of Lyon.

== Description ==
The painting illustrates the biblical flood that wiped out humanity on Earth. In the biblical story Noah and his family survive. The painting is seen as an allegory of a man attempting to save his father while a stable woman with a child begs for his help.

== Bibliography ==
- Bibliothèque-documentation du musée des Beaux-Arts de Lyon, dossier Scène du Déluge de Court.
