= Portrait of Napoleon III (Winterhalter) =

Painting by Franz Xaver Winterhalter

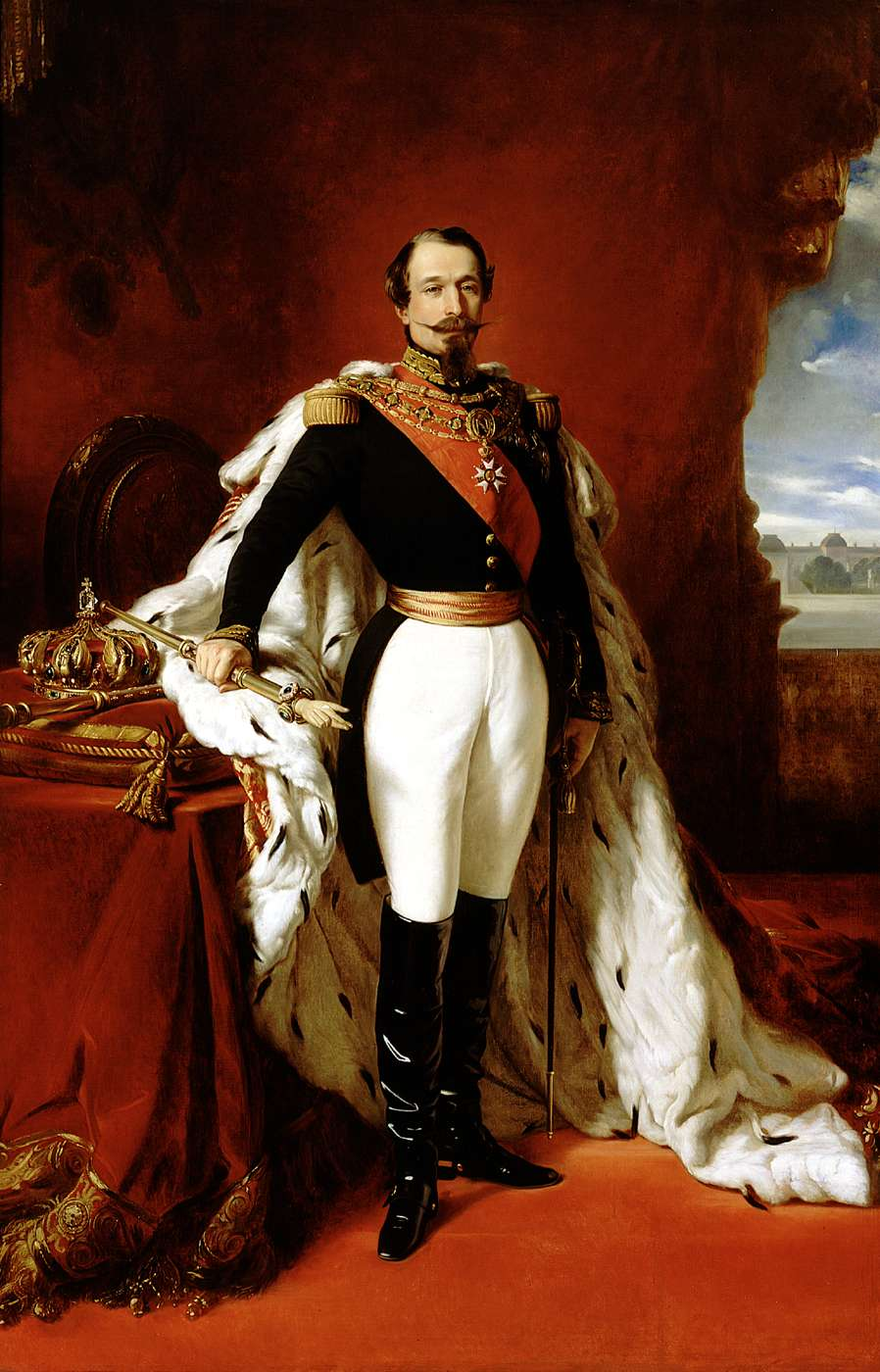
- Artist: Franz Xaver Winterhalter
- Year: 1853
- Medium: Oil on canvas
- Dimensions: 240 cm × 155 cm (94 in × 61 in)
- Location: lost, several copies extant

Portrait of Napoleon III was an oil on canvas painting by the German portrait painter Franz Xaver Winterhalter, created in 1853. It was an official portrait of the French Emperor Napoleon III, who reigned as Emperor of the Second French Empire from 1852 to 1870. The work had the dimensions of 240 cm high and 155 cm wide. The original portrait was lost in a fire in the Tuileries Palace, in Paris, in 1871, but is known because it was largely copied by other painters during the emperor's reign.

== History and description ==
Winterhalter had the reputation of being a leading portrait for the Royalty of Europe when he was commissioned to create two paintings of the emperor and his wife, Eugénie de Montijo, in 1852. Napoleon III wears the uniform of a lieutenant general or general, with a royal cloak over it. In reality, however, this royal cloak did not exist. In his right hand, he holds a scepter, named "the hand of justice", with a crown and another scepter on the table to the left. His left-hand rests on his saber, the famous Joyeuse. He wears the regalia of the Grand Master of the Legion of Honour, especially the chain and red ribbon. In the background, on the right, is the Tuileries Palace, the emperor's residence.

The original portrait was presented to the public during the Salon of 1855 at the World Exhibition in Paris, and afterward hung in the Tuileries Palace, also in Paris. Between 1855 and 1870, 540 versions of this portrait were made by various painters to decorate official buildings in France. The original work, and that of the empress, was lost in a fire in this palace during the Paris Commune on May 23, 1871.

Two studies for the portraits of Napoleon III and Eugénie de Montijo, made by Winterhalter and his studio in 1853, were discovered in two private collections, respectively in Italy and in Denmark, and auctioned at Christie's on 2 October 2013.
