= Saint-Sauveur de Bellême Church =

Parish church in the Bellême commune, France

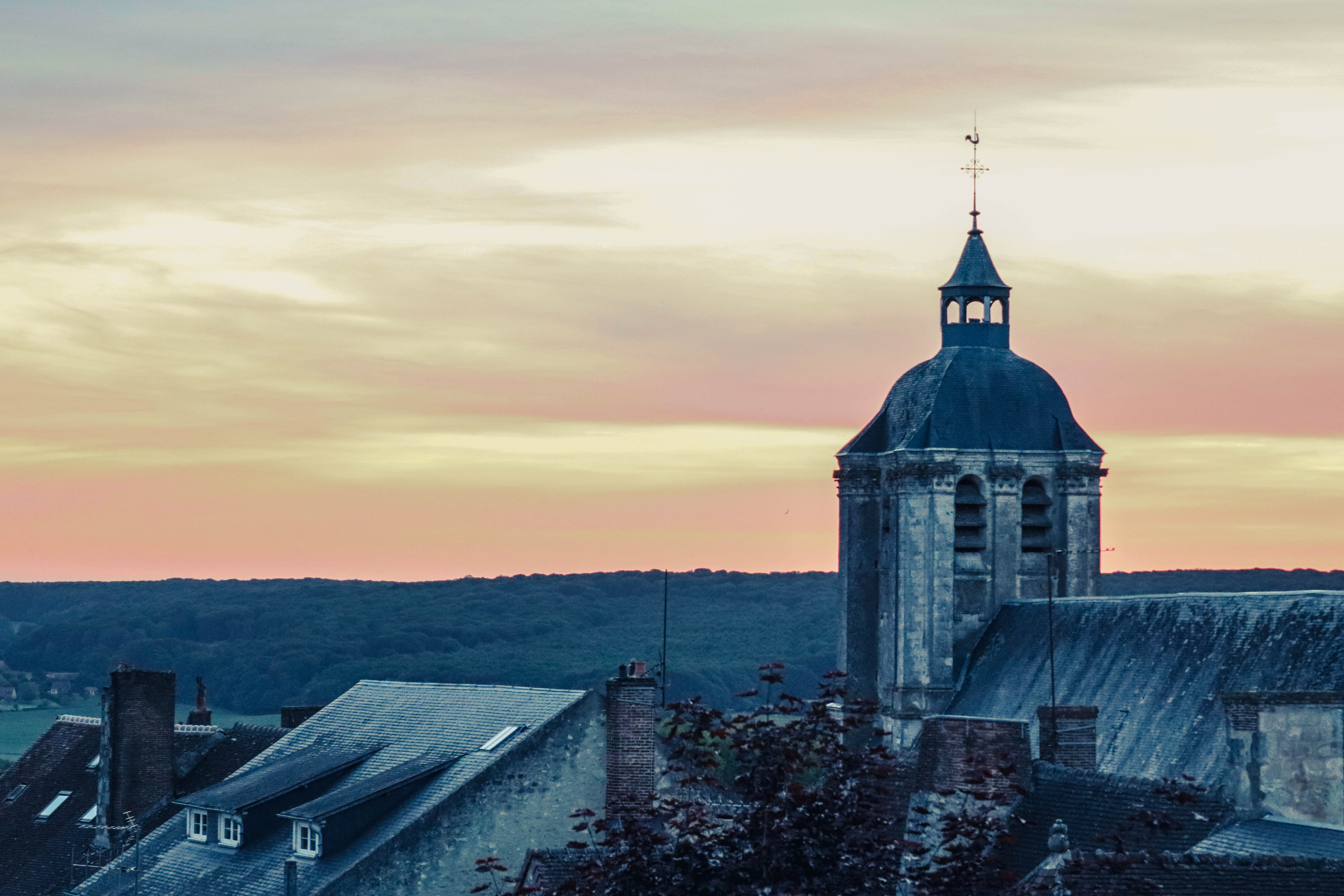
- The bell tower at sunset.
- Interactive map of the Saint-Sauveur de Bellême Church area

General information
- Type: Parish church
- Architectural style: Classical architecture
- Location: Bellême commune, Orne department, Normandy region, France
- Coordinates: 48°22′36″N 0°33′37″E
- Years built: 16th and 17th centuries
- Owner: Municipality of the Bellême commune

Design and construction
- Architects: Various, including Jean Palastre and Léonard Manguin.
- Awards and prizes: Monument historique (1936, tower) Monument historique (1987)
- Designations: Adscribed to the Roman Catholic Diocese of Séez jurisdiction from the Catholic Church confession

The Saint-Sauveur de Bellême Church is a Catholic parish church in Bellême city, in the French department of Orne within the Normandy region. At present, it is the only surviving church in the town.

It was built in classical style during the 16th and 17th centuries on the site of a former chapel. The interior contains some old features, but was largely rebuilt in the 19th century. The nave is surrounded by four chapels to the north and four to the south.

The tower (bell tower-porch) was listed as a historic monument in 1936, followed by the entire building in 1987. Elements of the statuary, paintings, woodwork, and furniture are protected as historic monuments.

== History ==
As early as the 11th century, two chapels, Saint-Pierre and Saint-Sauveur, were built outside the walls of the enclosed town of Bellême.

The foundations of the current building date from the 15th century. During the Wars of Religion, the chapel of Saint-Sauveur was destroyed by the troops of Gaspard II de Coligny in 1562 and 1572; the church was almost entirely rebuilt at the end of the 16th century. Jean Palastre was the architect ("master mason") of the church in 1622.

A new reconstruction campaign took place between 1678 and 1715. The front tower, which forms a bell tower and porch, was built in 1678. While the south-side chapels were built throughout the 17th century. The architect Léonard Manguin designed two of these chapels in 1658, the Le Roy and Petigars chapels, followed by the Saint-Thomas chapel in 1661. The sacristy and surrounding galleries, located behind the choir, were added in the second half of the 19th century.

Saint-Sauveur is the parish church of Bellême's town center, although its curacy is one of the smallest in the diocese. Regional masses are sometimes held in this church. On 31 March 1789, when the Estates General were convoked, the assembly of the three orders of the province of Perche met for a solemn mass in the church of Saint-Sauveur before going to deliberate.

In 1936, the tower was listed as a historic monument, followed on 6 November 1987, by the entire church.

The church is usually referred to as the "church of Bellême", being the only remaining church in the town. In the 21st century, it was part of the parish of Saint-Léonard-des-Clairières, attached to the Bellême deanery in the diocese of Séez. In addition to Sunday mass, it hosts various parish celebrations and concerts.

== Architecture ==
Built in the classical style, the church stands imposingly at 48 metres (157 ft) long and 15 metres (49 ft) wide. It consists of a bell tower above a porch, a nave with four side chapels on each side, and a five-sided choir.

The nave is 14 metres (46 ft) wide and lit by narrow, spaced windows. It is topped by an inverted ship-shaped roof with parquet flooring. The north-side chapels are integrated into the nave, while those on the south side are covered by a small roof, with an octagonal gable following the gradient of the nave roof.

The choir is continued by a five-sided apse. It is fairly dark, lit by windows on four of its five sides. The sacristy is attached to the fifth side, surrounded by low galleries arranged in a horseshoe shape around the chevet of the church and surmounted by a medieval gallery.

The porch bell tower on the west side of the church is the main architectural feature of the building. It is built from very hard silicified limestone and supported by four massive buttresses. These rise just above the nave wall, and the two on the outside of the façade are topped by pots à feu (fr). The portal, located between the two central buttresses, is framed by two columns with Ionic capitals and is connected to the roadway by a five-sided stoop. The second register contains all the ornamentation. On each of the buttresses, a niche houses a statue of an evangelist, and in the center, a niche houses a statue of a cast-iron Christ. The cul-de-lampes (a type of corbel in "church lamp"-style) (fr) supporting the evangelists are decorated with foliage. A third register, at the start of the roofs, decorates the top of the buttresses with mascarons and rinceau.

== Interior layout ==
The interior of the church contains some old features, but was largely rebuilt in the 19th century.

=== Choir ===
The choir is one step higher than the nave. The walls are covered with wood panelling from the Chartreuse de Val-Dieu dating back to the 18th century. Above the doors leading to the galleries of the sacristy are two paintings, also from the Carthusian monastery and dated 1768. One depicts Saint Anthony visiting Saint Paul the Hermit and the other Saint Bruno prostrate while another Carthusian digs a grave.

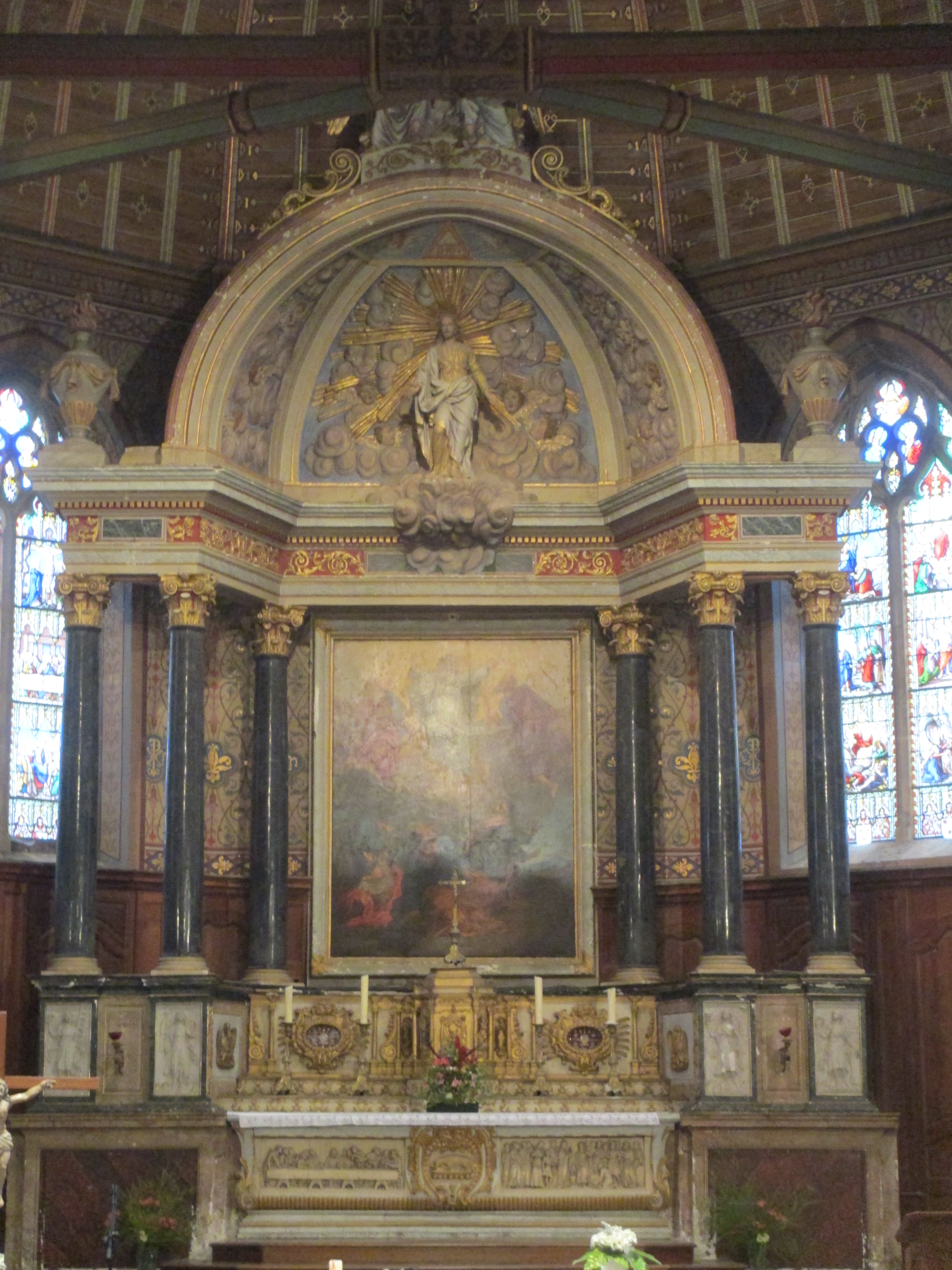
The high altar.

The centerpiece of the choir is the black marble, polychrome wood, gilded high altar. It dates from 1712 and occupies almost the entire space between the two doors. The pediment features Christ in Majesty. The altar box, in painted wood, ronde-bosse-style (in the round, free standing), is decorated with a Paschal lamb and two bas-reliefs. The one on the left, inspired by Leonardo da Vinci, represents the Last Supper, and the one on the right the maundy. The five-sided gilded wood tabernacle is framed by four columns that define the niches containing the statues. The altarpiece is set back under a wide cornice and canopy supported by six black marble columns topped with Corinthian capitals.

The central painting depicts the transfiguration of Christ. Measuring 2.8 metres (9 ft 2 in) high and 2.1 metres (6 ft 11 in) wide, it was painted in 1705 by Jacques Oudry and installed in the church at the end of March 1706. The conseil de fabrique (parish church administration) paid the painter 165 livres for his work.

=== Side chapels ===
The nave is flanked by four chapels to the north and the same number to the south. Most of them are decorated with old copies of paintings.

==== Northern chapels ====
Originally three in number, a fourth chapel was added at the end of the 19th century to restore symmetry with the southern chapels.

The first chapel up the nave, and the narrowest, is the Chapel of the Scapular. It houses a neo-classical altar and a painting of the Holy Family dating from the second half of the 18th century.

The second chapel was previously devoted to Saint Anne and has since been consecrated to the Virgin Mary. It was completely redecorated for the family of Aristide Boucicaut in 1878. On the outside wall, a marble funerary monument is adorned with an inscription in memory of the mother of the founder of Bon Marché. A Rosary painting by William Bouguereau adorns the altar and three mosaic medallions representing Saint Francis of Assisi, Saint James, and Saint Dominic complete the marble decorations.

The third chapel is dedicated to Saint Louis. It contains a classical-style altar built in the early 19th century and adorned with an altarpiece depicting the Entombment, painted in 1699.

The fourth chapel is devoted to Notre-Dame Auxiliatrice. Unlike the other more recent chapels, its window dates from the 15th century. The stained glass window, created between 1920 and 1925 by Louis Barillet and Jacques Le Chevallier, depicts the apparition of Saint Michael to Joan of Arc and commemorates the dead from World War I.

==== Southern chapels ====
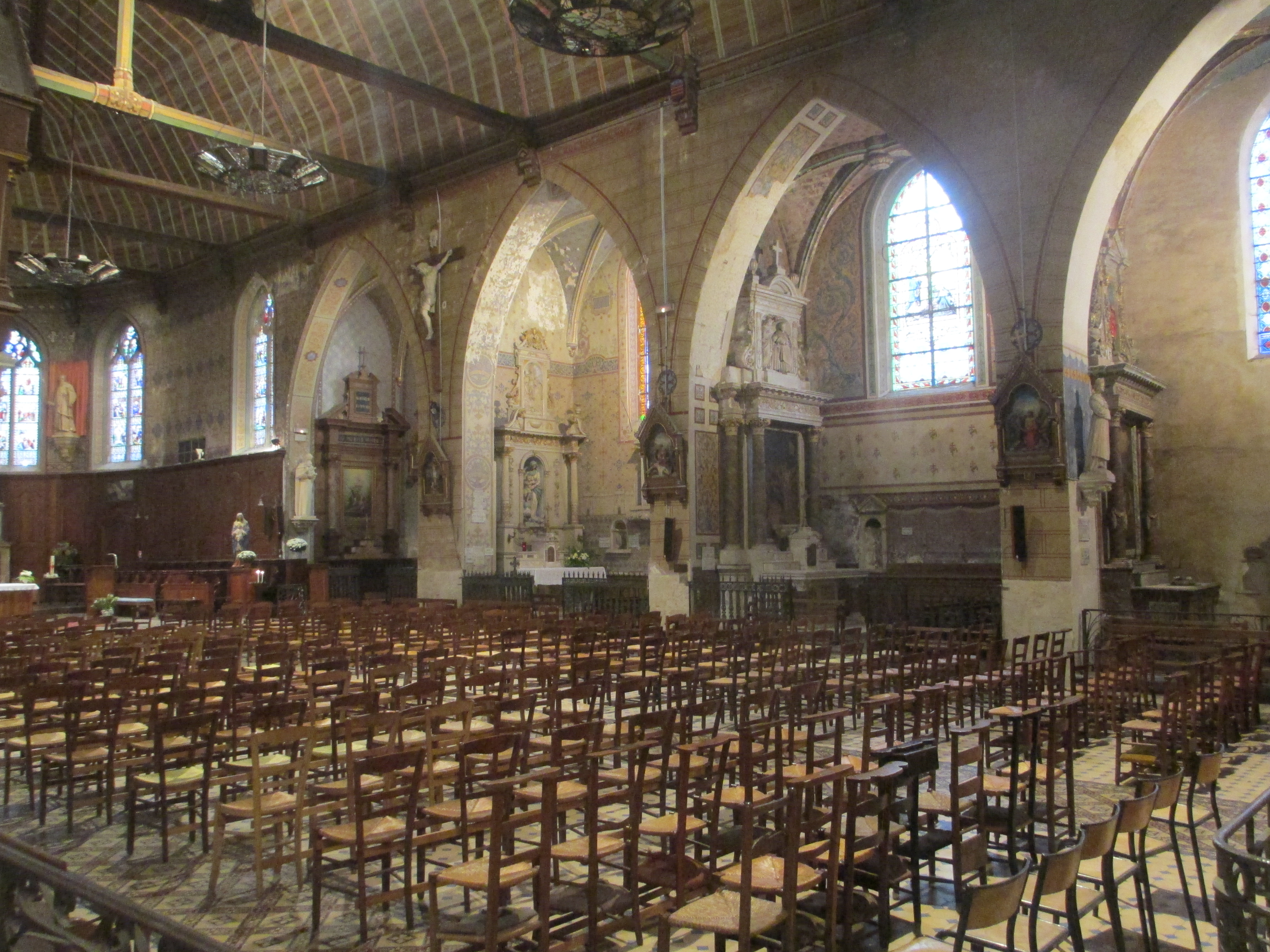
The nave of the church and its southern chapels.

The dates engraved on the keystones indicate that these chapels were inaugurated consecutively during the 17th century.

Going up the nave, the first chapel is devoted to Saint Catherine of Alexandria. It features a painting of the Adoration of the Shepherds, by Nicolas Mignard, on a classical polychrome stone altar.

The second chapel contains a painting of Saint Thomas the Apostle touching the Five Holy Wounds. A copy of a painting by Francesco Salviati that is now in the Louvre.

The third chapel is currently dedicated to the Immaculate Conception, after having been devoted to Saint Louis until the mid-nineteenth century. A funerary monument in limestone and black marble is attached to the outside wall of the chapel. It is the tomb of Louis Petitgars, Seigneur de la Bergerie, who died in 1669 after founding the chapel in 1662.

The fourth chapel is devoted to Saint Joseph. It contains a painting of the four Evangelists by Nicolas-René Jollain, created in 1780 for the Val-Dieu Charterhouse, placed in the Alençon library in 1792, and then deposited in the church of Saint-Sauveur.

=== Baptismal font ===
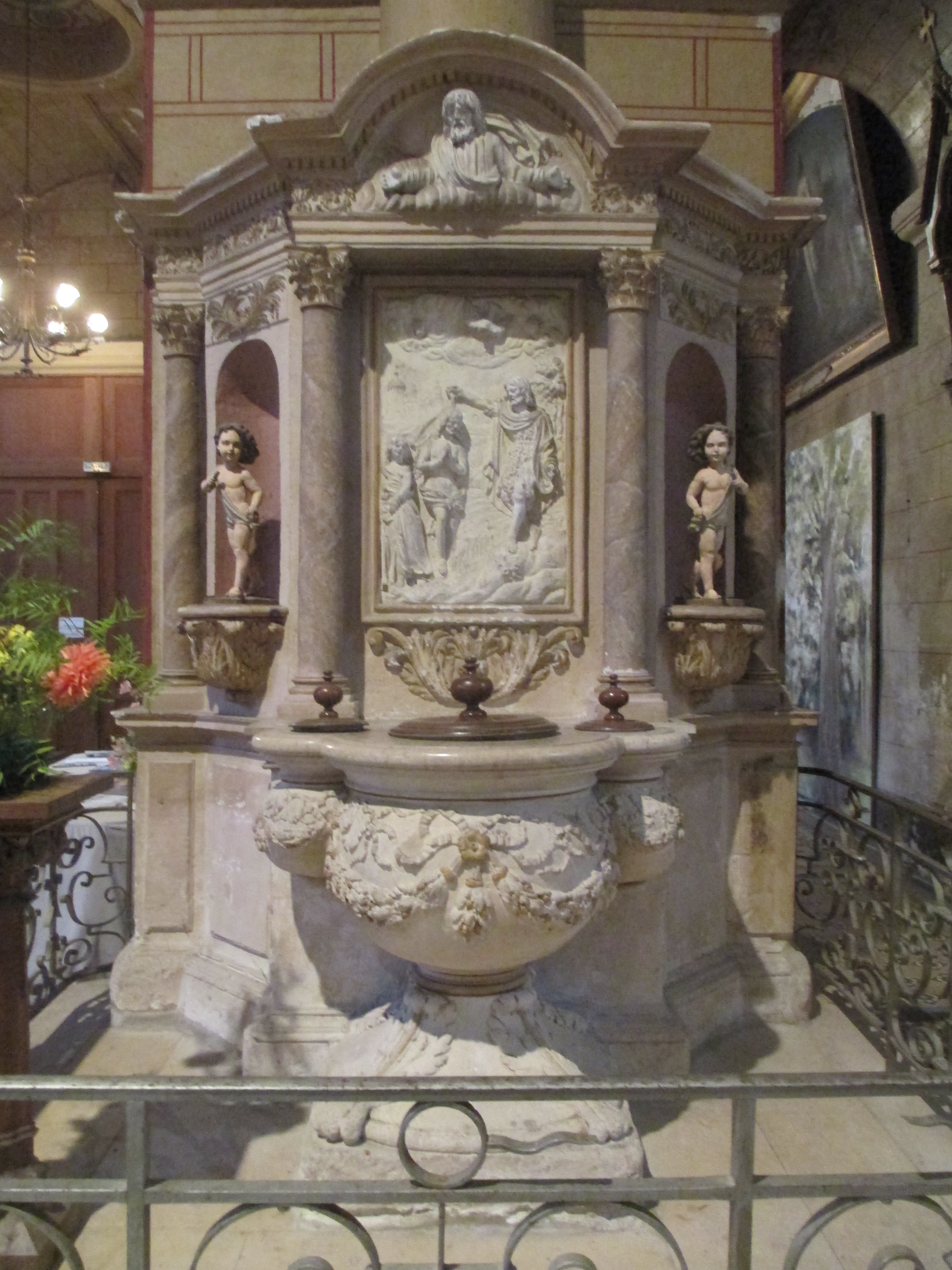
The baptismal font in the church.

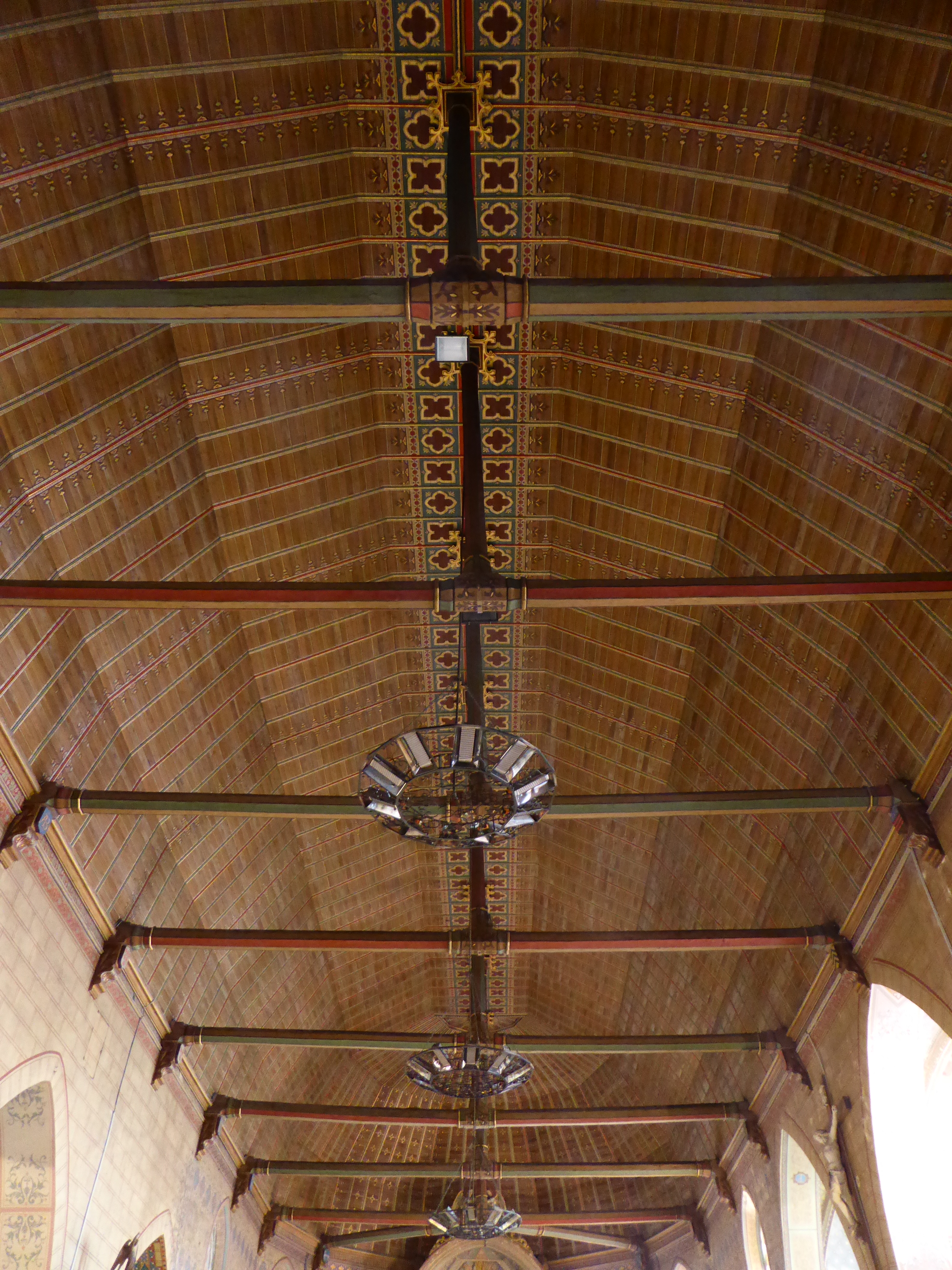
Nave ceiling in the Saint-Sauveur de Bellême church.

The baptismal font was created in 1684 by the Mance sculptor Durand. The basin rests on a support that widens out at the base. Three metres (9.8 ft) high and more than one metre (3 ft 3 in) wide, the basins and bas-reliefs are made of limestone, while the high reliefs are in stucco.

Above the basin lies an altarpiece divided into three panels. The baptism of Christ is depicted in the center. Beneath a sort of pediment, a bust of God the Father dominates the scene. Two statuettes of cherubs frame this central scene, despite the fact that the originals were stolen in the 1970s. The sides of the altarpiece are separated by Corinthian columns.

=== Ceiling ===
During the restoration of the church in the 19th century, the ceiling was repainted. Like many Normandy churches, it is composed of painted paneling covering an inverted hull frame made up of four sections at different angles.

== See also ==
=== Bibliography ===
- Association des amis du Perche, "Église Saint-Sauveur", Cahiers Percherons, no 51 "Bellême I", 1976 ISBN 2-900122-52-X.
- Philippe Siguret, "Bellême: History and Tourism", Cahiers Percherons, no 4, 1957.
- Émile Travers, La Normandie monumentale et pittoresque : Orne deuxième partie, Le Havre, Lemale, 1896 (read online archive).
- Louis-Joseph Fret, Antiquités et chroniques percheronnes, vol. 3, Glaçon, 1840 (read online archive).

=== External links ===
- Resources on religion: Clochers de France Observatoire du patrimoine religieux (Religious heritage observatory)
- Resources relating to architecture: Mérimée
