= Flandrin =

Flandrin is a French surname. Notable people with the surname include a family of 19th and 20th-century painters:

- Jean-Hippolyte Flandrin (1809–1864), French painter, the best-known of the family
- Paul Flandrin (1811–1902), painter, brother of Jean-Hippolyte
- Marthe Flandrin (1904–1987), painter and mosaicist, daughter of the architect Joseph Flandrin (1857–1939), son of Paul
- Jules Flandrin (1871–1947), painter

The Flandrins are not to be confused with:

- Eugène Flandin (1809–1889), also a French painter
- Marcelin Flandrin (1889–1957), a French photographer
