= Basilica of Notre-Dame de la Trinité =

Roman Catholic basilica church in Blois, France

Coordinates: 47.5939°N 1.3433°E

The Basilica of Notre-Dame de la Trinité (French: Basilique Notre-Dame de la Trinité) is a Roman Catholic basilica church located in Blois, in the Loir-et-Cher department of France. It is dedicated to the Our Lady of the Trinity.

== History ==
Devotion to Our Lady of the Trinity began in the early 20th century thanks to Father Jean-Baptiste, a Capuchin brother in the convent in Blois. He devoted his whole life to preaching, expanding use of the triple Ave Maria prayer and publishing tracts in several languages on the topic. He was succeeded by Father Clovis, who studied and got to know the theological basis for Marian devotion to the triple Ave Maria, which found its expression in the title 'Our Lady of the Trinity'.

In 1921 Pope Benedict XV approved the Archconfraternity of the Triple Ave Maria, intended to spread this devotion. Father Clovis thus set up a subscription to build a church as the international centre for the devotion. Work began in 1932 and was resumed under a new architect, Paul Rouvière, in 1935. The church was consecrated in 1949. Father Grégoire completed the sanctuary and gained its promotion to a minor basilica by Pope Pius XII in 1956. The whole complex of the church, cloister, galleries, convent buildings and the stained glass windows were inscribed on France's historic monuments list in 1994 and again in 1996.

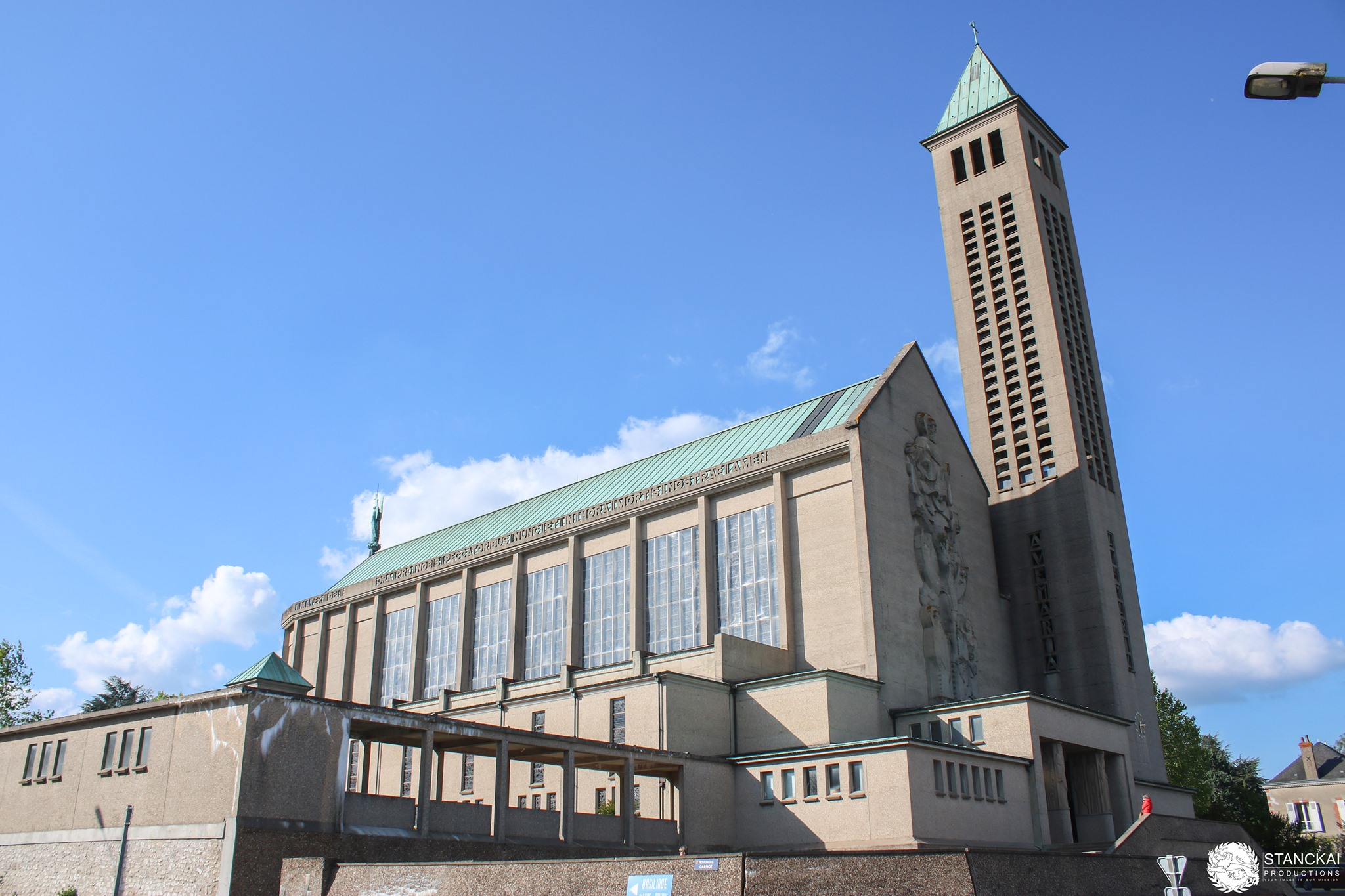
Basilica of Our Lady of the Trinity in Blois, France

== Architecture ==
The basilica has a largely uniform architectural and decorative style and is considered as one of the major works of French Christian inter-war art. It has fourteen large windows illustrating the mysteries of Mary in the history of salvation at the heart of the Trinity, designed by Louis Barillet, Jacques Le Chevallier and Théodore-Gérard Hanssen. The vault mosaic over the high altar develops those themes, whilst the other ceiling mosaics are by Marthe Flandrin. A frieze by the sculptor Jean Lambert-Rucki runs down both sides of the nave, showing the Stations of the Cross.
