= Bellême =

- Commune
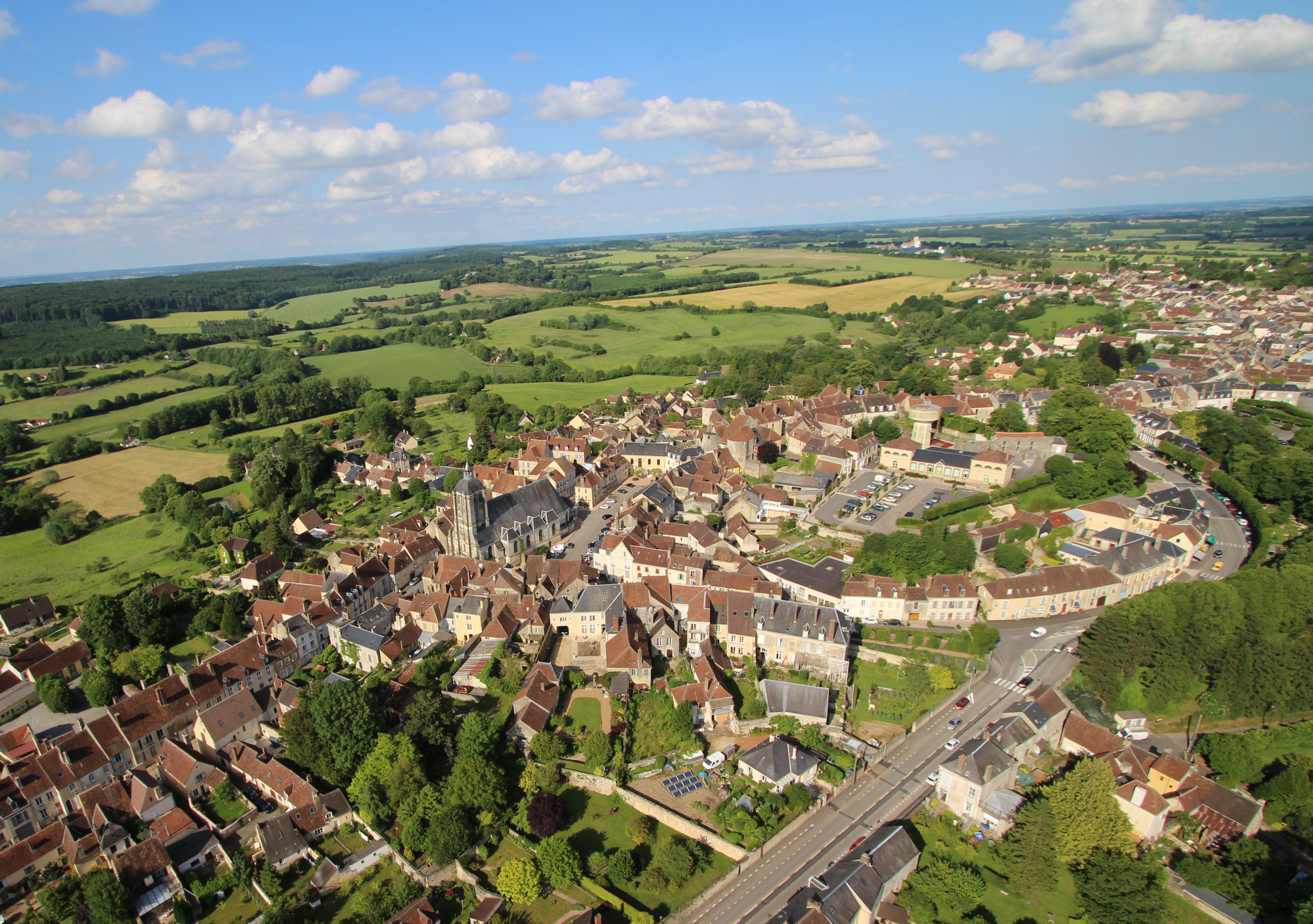
- An aerial view of Bellême

- Coat of arms
- Location of Bellême
- Location within France Location within Normandy
- Coordinates: 48°22′38″N 0°33′41″E
- Country: France
- Region: Normandy
- Department: Orne
- Arrondissement: Mortagne-au-Perche
- Canton: Ceton

Government
  - Mayor (2020–2026): Rémy Tessier
- Area^{1}: 1.71 km^{2} (0.66 sq mi)
- Highest elevation: 230 m (750 ft)
- Lowest elevation: 162 m (531 ft)
- Population (2023): 1,457
  - Density: 852/km^{2} (2,210/sq mi)
- Time zone: UTC+01:00 (CET)
  - Summer (DST): UTC+02:00 (CEST)
- INSEE/Postal code: 61038 /61130
- ^{1} French Land Register data, which excludes lakes, ponds, glaciers > 1 km^{2} (0.386 sq mi or 247 acres) and river estuaries.

Bellême (French pronunciation: [bɛlɛm]) is a commune in the Orne department in northwestern France. It is classed as a Petites Cités de Caractère. The musicologist Guillaume André Villoteau (1759–1839) was born in Bellême, as was Aristide Boucicaut (1810–1877), owner of Le Bon Marché, the world's first department store. This town is possibly the origin of the English and French surname Bellamy.

== Geography ==
At the heart of the Parc Naturel Régional du Perche, in the Orne Department, Bellême is on a hill that dominates the Perche area.

The commune is made up of the following collection of villages and hamlets, Les Trois Coins, Bellême, Les Castors and Le Val.

== Population ==
Historical population
Year	Pop.	±% p.a.
1968	1,742	—
1975	1,843	+0.81%
1982	1,849	+0.05%
1990	1,788	−0.42%
1999	1,774	−0.09%
2007	1,576	−1.47%
2012	1,593	+0.21%
2017	1,464	−1.67%
2023	1,457	−0.08%
Source: INSEE

== Heraldry ==
Arms of Bellême	The arms of Bellême are blazoned : Sable, a triple-towered keep Or. or Azure semy de lys Or, a bordure gules bezanty (Or).

== Sights ==
- 17th century and eighteenth century houses.
- 17th century Hôtel de ville.
- Sundials on rue du Château, place de la République and place Liègeard.
- Château gatehouse 15th century, and moat.

=== National heritage sites ===
The Commune has six buildings and areas listed as a Monument historique.

- Saint-Sauveur de Bellême Church 15th century, 16th century, rebuilt between 1675 and 1710.
- Crypt of the Saint-Santin Chapel, dating from the tenth century.
- Bansard des Bois Hotel - 18th Century hotel.
- Governors House - 17th to 19th Century house built from the Hotel De Fontenay.
- City gate entrance - Built in the 15th Century
- Clock Tower - 13th Century polygonal tower and the only remaining parts of the old city walls.

== Landscape ==
- The town is built around the crest of a natural bowl, in which sits an outdoor lido (swimming pool), moto-cross circuit, stables and an expansive 18-hole golf course with adjacent hotel and holiday apartments.

== Events ==
- Les Mycologiades internationales : Annual international wild mushroom festival.

== International relations ==
Bellême is twinned with:

- Goring-on-Thames United Kingdom since 1979.
- Stühlingen Germany since 1980.

== Sports ==
- The town's football club, FC Pays Bellêmois, compete in the Ligue de Football Basse-Normandie and the Coupe de France, playing their home games at the town's Terrain Intercommunal.
- Moto Club Bellêmois hosts motocross events that welcome an international field of competitors.

== Notable people ==
- Yves de Bellême (died c. 1005), Seigneur de Bellême, the first known progenitor of the House of Bellême.
- Guillaume André Villoteau (1759- 1839) was a French musicologist born in Bellême.
- Aristide Boucicaut (1810 – 1877) French entrepreneur who created Le Bon Marché, was born here.
- Alfred Bansard des Bois (1848–1920) a French politician who died here.
- Théodore Tuffier (1857 – 1929) a French surgeon who was born here.
- Augustin de Romanet de Beaune (b. 1961) a French political advisor and business executive, chief executive officer of Groupe ADP was a municipal councillor here for 19 years.

== See also ==
- Communes of the Orne department
- House of Bellême
- Robert de Bellême
- Perche
