= Marguerite Boucicaut =

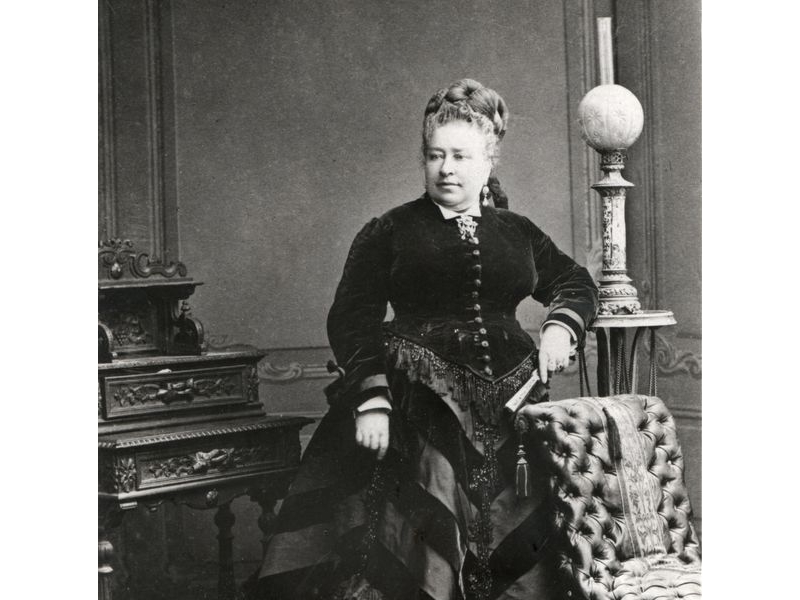
Marguerite Boucicaut

Marguerite Boucicaut (née Guérin; born 3 January 1816, Verjux – 8 December 1887, Cannes) was a French businesswoman and benefactor. She participated in the creation and prosperity of the first department store in Paris, Au Bon Marché, alongside her husband Aristide Boucicaut. She became a philanthropist later in life.

== Early life ==
Marguerite was raised by a single mother after her birth in Verjux, in Saône et Loire. Her mother died when Marguerite was thirteen, and Marguerite moved to Paris to work for a laundress on the Rue de Bac. Eventually, she built up her savings and opened a creamery. It was here that she met her future husband Aristide.

Marguerite and Aristide began their relationship in 1836. In 1839, she had a son, but he died as an infant.

== The Bon Marché ==
In 1852 Aristide and Marguerite Boucicaut began to scale the business model of their small shop on the corner of Rue de Sèvres and Rue de Bac. The department store is still known today as Le Bon Marché.

The Boucicaut's treatment of their employees was novel for the time - a paternalistic relationship where the employees were given food, housing, entertainment, and education. In return, they expected loyalty and adherence to a moral code.

In 1880, Marguerite changed the company to a société en commandite, or a partnership with her top managers that continued the "family" nature of the Bon Marché even after her death. With no heirs, Marguerite willed her fortune to the employees of the Bon Marche and her social works, including a hospital and a home for unwed mothers.
