= Théodore-Gérard Hanssen =

Belgian stained glass artist

Théodore-Gérard Hanssen, best known under the name Théo Hanssen (10 August 1885, Wonck - 29 May 1957, Roanne) was a Belgian stained glass artist mainly active in France. His windows include some of those at Notre-Dame de la Trinité Basilica in Blois. He also painted in oils and watercolour, worked in enamel and designed church vestments, as well as being an amateur musician.

He is considered as one of the main revivers of glass-making techniques, alongside Louis Barillet and Jacques Le Chevallier, with whom he worked in Paris between 1920 and 1940 as collaborators at the Atelier Barillet. He moved to Roanne during World War II and there taught Pierre Étaix.

== Bibliography ==
- Atelier Louis Barillet, maître verrier, éditions 15, square de Vergennes, 2005
