= Guillaume André Villoteau =

French musicologist

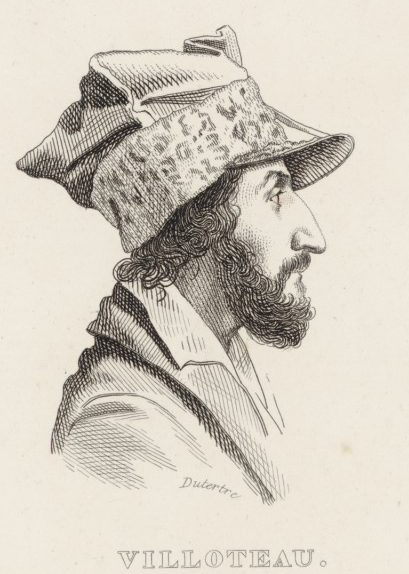
Guillaume André Villoteau

Guillaume André Villoteau (19 September 1759 in Bellême – 27 April 1839 in Tours) was a French musicologist.

== Biography ==
An ambulant musician, engaged in the dragons, Villoteau then integrated the mastery of Notre Dame de Paris on the eve of the French Revolution. He left the orders and entered the Paris Opera during the Reign of Terror where he became conductor of the choir.

The singer François Lays having refused to leave, he took his place in the Commission des sciences et des arts which accompanied the army of the East during the French campaign in Egypt and Syria by Bonaparte.

Villoteau was particularly interested in Arabic music. He started from scratch and could not rely on any music score: his interlocutors benefited only from an oral transmission.

He had the opportunity to carry out his musical research until Philæ, and collected a valuable collection of instruments bought by his friend François-Joseph Fétis and donated to the Museum of Music of Brussels. His contributions to music form 505 pages in the Imperial edition in folio of the Description de l'Égypte and 1015 pages in the Panckoucke edition. It will be a real treatise on Egyptian music, past and present.

On his return to France, he retired in 1809 to his property of the Mazerais, a commune of Savonnières, where he became mayor from 1813 to 1815. He then moved to Tours where he set up the first mutual school in the city.

== Selected publications ==
- Recherches sur l'analogie de la musique avec les arts, v. I y v. II, Paris: Imperial edition, 1807
- Dissertation sur les diverses espèces d'instruments de musique que l'on remarque parmi les sculptures qui décorent les antiques monuments de l'Égypte. In Description de l'Égypte, Paris: Prunelle, Imperial edition, 1809, p. 181.
- Description historique, technique et littéraire des instruments de musique des Orientaux, Paris: Imperial edition, 1813
- De l'état actuel de l'art musical en Egypte. Relation historique et descriptive des recherches et observations faites sur la musique en ce pays. In Description de l'Égypte, Paris: Panckoucke, 1827.
- Musique de l'antique Egypte, Brussels: Degreef-Laduron, 1830.

== Bibliography ==
- Fétis (Jean-François), "Villoteau", in Dictionnaire universelle des musiciens, Bruxelles, 1844, vol. 8, p. 459–464.
- Mayaud (Isabelle), "Guillaume-André Villoteau (1759–1839) et l'Égypte : l'expérience d'une vie", in Voyages et voyageurs, circulation des hommes et des idées à l'époque révolutionnaire, actes du 130e congrès des sociétés savantes, La Rochelle, April 2005, p. 121132.
- Grinevald (Paul-Marie), "Villoteau, ethno-musicien de Bonaparte et de l’Égypte", Touraine Généalogie, Bulletin n° 92, 4th trimester 2012, p. 398.
- Grinevald (Paul-Marie), Guillaume-André Villoteau (1759-1839): Ethnomusicographe de l'Égypte, Paris, L'Harmattan, 2014. 302 p. (series: L'Univers musical). ISBN 978-2-343-03310-5
