= Odalisque with Slave =

1839 painting by Ingres

- L'Odalisque à l'esclave (French)
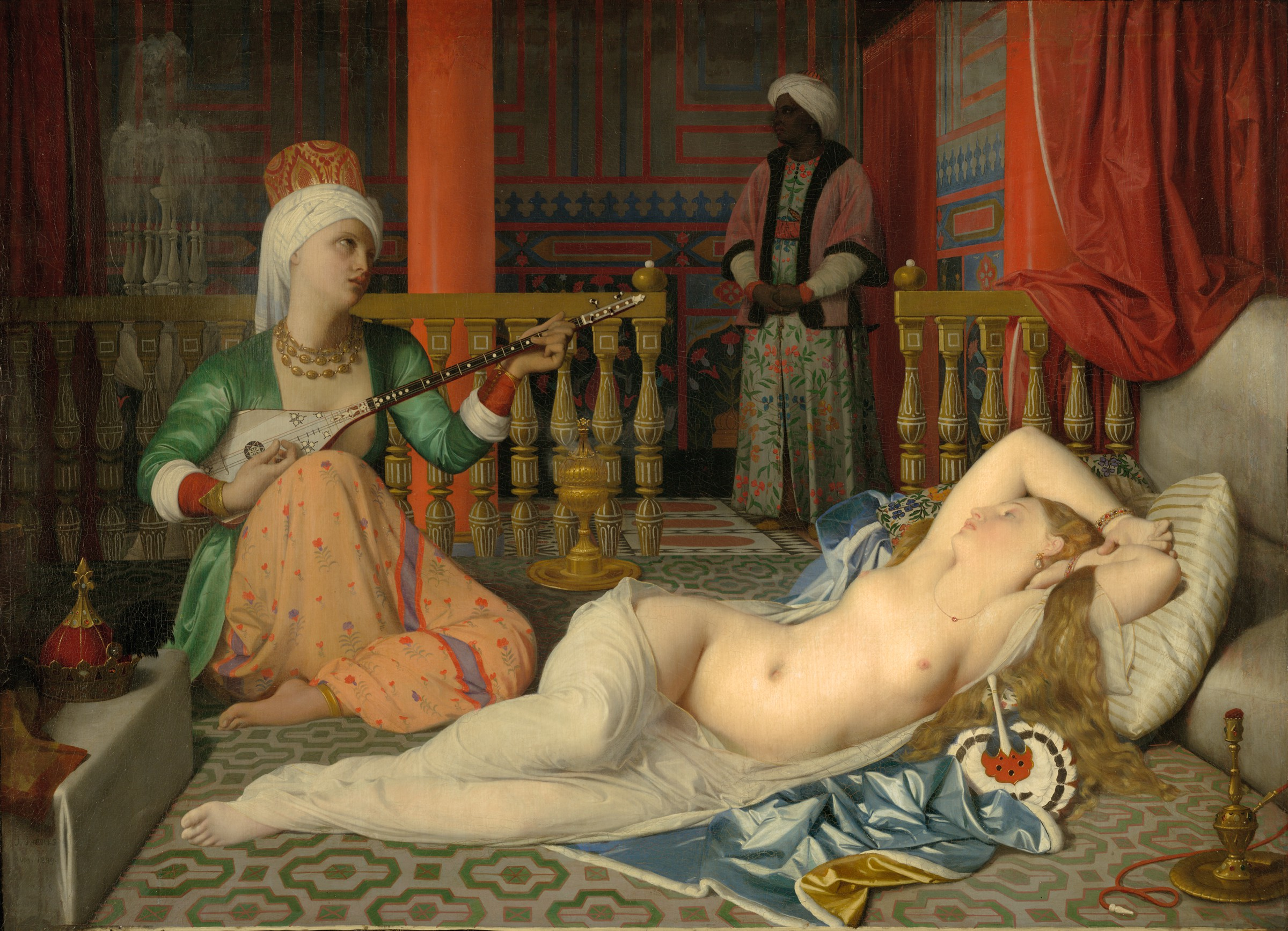
- Artist: Jean-Auguste-Dominique Ingres
- Year: 1839
- Medium: Oil on canvas
- Dimensions: 72.1 cm × 100.3 cm (28.4 in × 39.5 in)
- Location: Harvard Art Museums/Fogg Museum; Cambridge, Massachusetts

Odalisque with Slave (French: L'Odalisque à l'esclave) is an 1839 painting by Jean-Auguste-Dominique Ingres commissioned by Charles Marcotte. Made using oil on canvas, it depicts a nude odalisque, a musician, and a eunuch in a harem interior. The painting is currently in the Fogg Art Museum in Cambridge, Massachusetts. It is a classic piece of Orientalism in French painting.

== History ==
Ingres painted a number of harem scenes during his long career, starting with the Grande Odalisque (1814). These works exemplify a taste for Orientalist subject matter shared by many French painters of the Romantic era, notably Ingres' rival Eugène Delacroix. As Ingres never visited the Near East, Odalisque with Slave depicts an imaginary scene. It was composed in Rome where the artist lived from 1835 to 1841 while serving as director of the French Academy there. The odalisque was painted from a life drawing Ingres had made years earlier. The musician was painted from a model posed in the studio, and many details such as the tanbour were derived from engravings.

Ingres labored over the execution with his usual attention to detail and enlisted some of his students as assistants. One of them, Raymond Balze, wrote: "Ingres began his studies from nature and prepared the rough sketch on his canvas, then had made by his students the less important parts, very finished, such as the architecture, mosaics, rugs, furniture, instruments, which he often had [them] reposition, reluctantly [as he was] satisfied with their execution ... Then everything being finished with the figures, he alone undertook to harmonize the ensemble with onion skins of color."

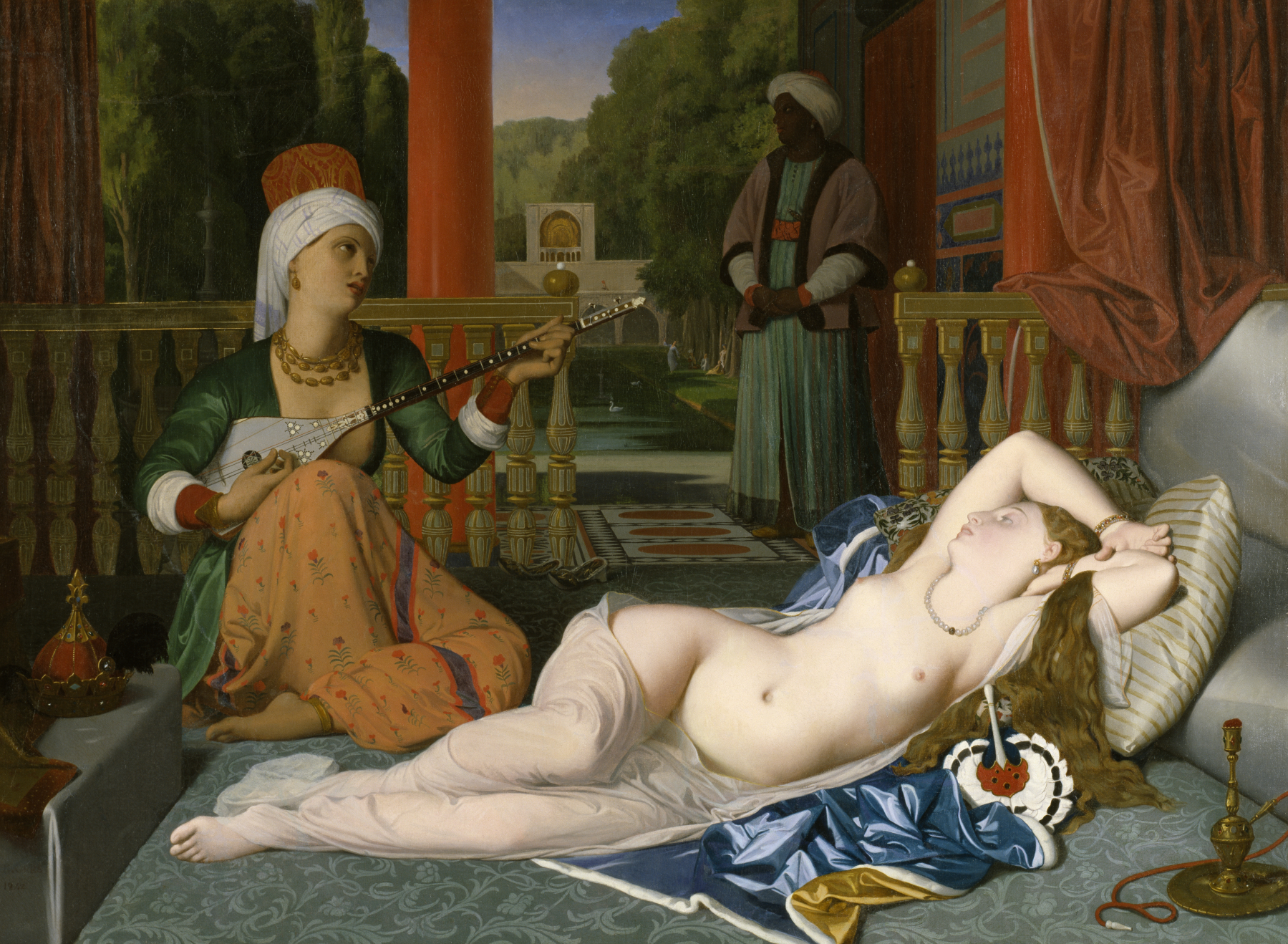
1842 version, in the Walters Art Museum, Baltimore

In September 1840 the painting was delivered to Paris, where it won praise from critics who viewed it in the owner's home. When exhibited publicly in 1845, the painting was widely admired, and written about by Baudelaire and Théophile Thoré-Bürger.

Ingres made a second version in 1842 with the help of his students Paul and Jean-Hippolyte Flandrin which is at the Walters Art Museum in Baltimore. In this version the background wall, described by art historian Karin Grimme as imprisoning the odalisque in "a room with no exit", was replaced with a garden painted by Paul Flandrin, inspired by the park at the Château de Dampierre.

The Louvre owns an 1858 drawing by Ingres that replicates the 1839 composition.

== See also ==
- List of paintings by Jean-Auguste-Dominique Ingres
