= Louis Barillet =

French artist

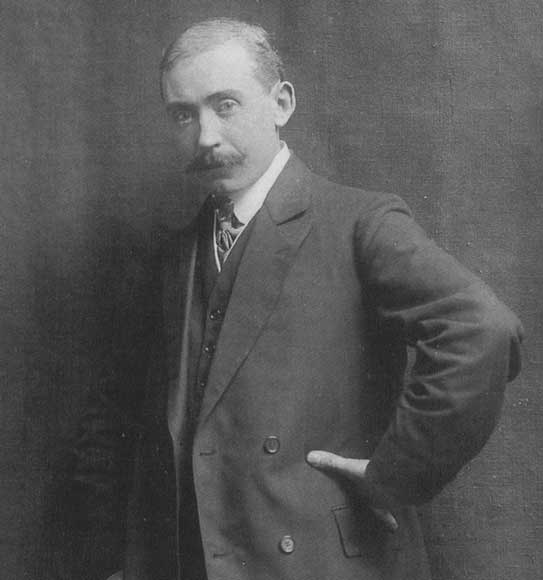
- Louis Barillet in 1910
- Born: February 13, 1880; Alençon
- Died: December 11, 1948 (aged 68); Clamart
- Occupation: Artist
- Children: Jean Barillet
- Parent(s): Alfred & Marie Barillet

Louis Barillet (1880 – 1948) was a French artist, known for his work in stained glass. Among those with whom he collaborated were Théodore-Gérard Hanssen and Jacques Le Chevallier. His windows may be seen in the church of Notre-Dame-des-Missions-du-cygne d'Enghien and in the Saint-Sauveur de Bellême Church.
