= Marthe Flandrin =

French artist and painter

Marthe Flandrin (4 August 1904–1987) was a French artist and painter, specializing in frescos, as at Saint-Hilaire-du-Harcouët, but also producing designs for mosaics and tapestries, such as her 1962 ceiling mosaics for Notre-Dame de la Trinité Basilica in Blois. She was the daughter of the architect Joseph Flandrin (1857–1939) and the artist Jeanne Train (1864–1947). Both her parents were from artistic families ― Joseph's father was the painter Paul Flandrin.

== Bibliography ==
- Dictionnaire Bénézit
- Séverine Muteau, Josette Galiègue, Michèle Lefrançois, Marthe Flandrin, catalogue de l'exposition du musée d'art et d'histoire de la Ville d'Avranches, Éditions Gourcuff-Gradenigo, 2010, 206.p., 600 illustrations.
