= Jacques Le Chevallier =

French glassmaker, decorative artist, illustrator and engraver

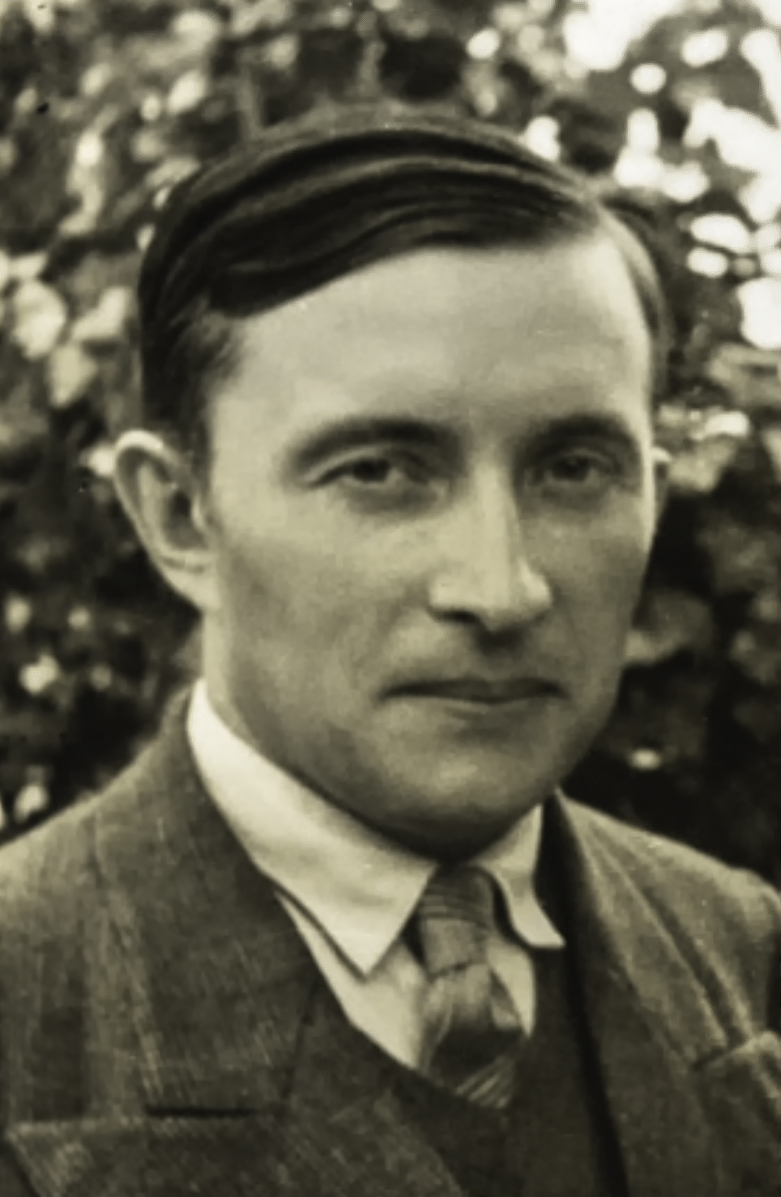
- photograph of Jacques Le Chevallier
- Born: 23 July 1896; 15th arrondissement of Paris
- Died: 23 July 1987 (aged 91); Fontenay-aux-Roses
- Resting place: Cimetière de Fontenay-aux-Roses
- Occupations: Glassmaker, decorative artist, illustrator, and engraver

Jacques Le Chevallier (French pronunciation: [ʒak lə ʃəvalje]; July 26, 1896 – 1987) was a French glassmaker, decorative artist, illustrator, and engraver. He was mobilized during World War I; after the war he became a master artisan in the studio of Louis Barillet, with whom he remained until 1945. His collaborators there included Théodore-Gérard Hanssen.

== Biography ==
His father was a representative in the architecture circles and his mother an art teacher in Paris.

As a child, Le Chevallier attended the École natione des Arts décoratifs between 1911 and 1915 where he was a student of Paul Renouard and Eugene Morand. Although mobilized during World War I, Le Chevallier eventually became a master artisan in 1920 in the studio of Louis Barillet with whom he remained until 1945.

Le Chevallier was a member of the Société des artistes décorateurs and secretary of the Salon d'Automne, in which he sometimes participated in as an artist doing paintings and watercolors. He was also one of the 25 founding members of the Union des Artistes Moderne (UAM) in 1929.

In 1948, Le Chevallier organized the Centre d’Art sacré in collaboration with Maurice Rocher and has been a lecturer in stained glass windows at the École supérieure des Beaux-Arts.

== Works ==
He is among others known for his production of luminaries during the 1920s and 1930s. He used industrial materials to create lamps designed for individuals in general or to be used in well-defined architectural projects.

Le Chevallier also created a number of stained glass windows in the studio of Louis Barillet, 15 Square de Vergennes, for the French Pavilion at the Exposition international des Arts décoratifs de 1925 in Paris.

He worked on the windows of churches and chapels in France, Belgium and Switzerland (Doullens, La Roche-Posay, Noireau Conde-sur-, Notre Dame du Cap Lihou, Saint-Sauveur de Bellême Church, Saint-Hilaire-du-Harcouët, Bourg-en-Bresse, Église Saint-Samson at Les Monts d'Aunay ) and cathedrals ( Notre-Dame de Paris, Saint-Maurice d'Angers, Saint-Pierre de Beauvais, Saint-Jean de Besançon, Saint-Etienne de Toulouse, Cathedral of Laon, Soissons Cathedral) and abroad in the framework of the Second Reconstruction. He also made the windows of the Church of Our Lady (Liebfrauenkirche) in Trier

Among his finest achievements are the works done with the help of his son Borny (Metz) for the Church of Saint-Pierre de Pingusson.

== Expositions ==
Several exhibits are devoted to Le Chevallier in 2007–2008. They include:

- Piscine de Roubaix
- Musée départemental de l'Oise in Beauvais
- la Fondation Solange Bertrand in Montigny-lès-Metz
- 15 Square de Vergennes in Paris.
