= Paul Flandrin =

French painter (1811–1902)

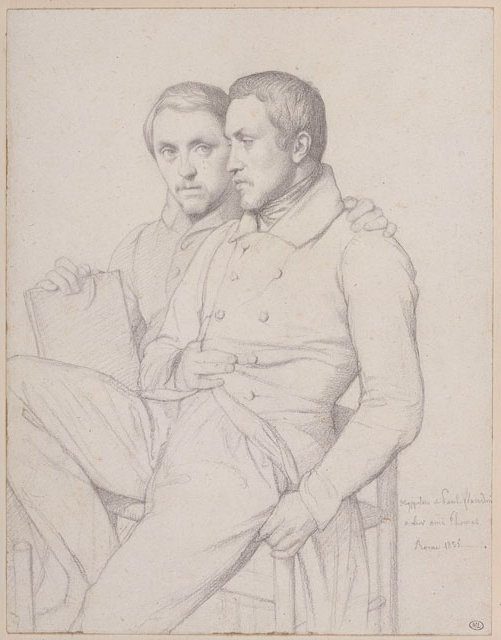
Double selfportrait of Hippolyte and Paul Flandrin, 1835, musée du Louvre, Paris.

Paul Jean Flandrin (28 May 1811, Lyon – 8 March 1902, Paris) was a French painter. He was the younger brother of the painters Auguste Flandrin and Hippolyte Flandrin.

== Life ==
Flandrin first trained with Antoine Duclaux (a landscape painter and animal painter from Lyon) and Jean-François Legendre-Héral (a sculptor), before joining the École des beaux-arts de Lyon, then the École des beaux-arts de Paris. He then joined the studio of Dominique Ingres. He competed for the prix de Rome twice and was unsuccessful both times, but still managed to get to Rome at his own expense, joining his brother Hippolyte, who had already won the prize. They spent four years in Rome, during which Paul specialized in landscape painting, making studies after nature which he later worked up into history paintings for the Paris salons. He also regularly collaborated with his brother, providing the landscape backgrounds for the latter's works.

As well as being one of the most notable proponents of the classical landscape tradition alongside Édouard Bertin and Alexandre Desgoffe (whose daughter Aline he married in 1852), Paul Flandrin evolved later in his career towards a more naturalistic style. He also produced portraits in oils and pencil as well as caricatures. He and Aline Desgoffe had one child, Joseph Flandrin (1857–1939), who became an architect and was the father of the painter Marthe Flandrin (1904–1987).

== Works in public collections ==
- Landscape, a proscribed man says farewell to his family (Paysage, les adieux d'un proscrit à sa famille) or Sabine Mountains (Montagnes de la Sabine), 1838, musée du Louvre, Paris
- Solitude, 1857, musée du Louvre, Paris
- Penitents for the dead in the Roman Campagna (Les Pénitents de la mort dans la campagne de Rome), 1840, musée des beaux-arts de Lyon
- The Atlas Gorge (Gorges de l'Atlas), c.1844-1845, musée d'art et d'histoire de Langres
- The Banks of the Rhône at Givors, 1855, musée des beaux-arts de Lyon
- The School at Saint-Denis, from the park, Palais de la Légion d'honneur, Paris
- The Head of an African, ca. 1830, Seattle Art Museum, Seattle
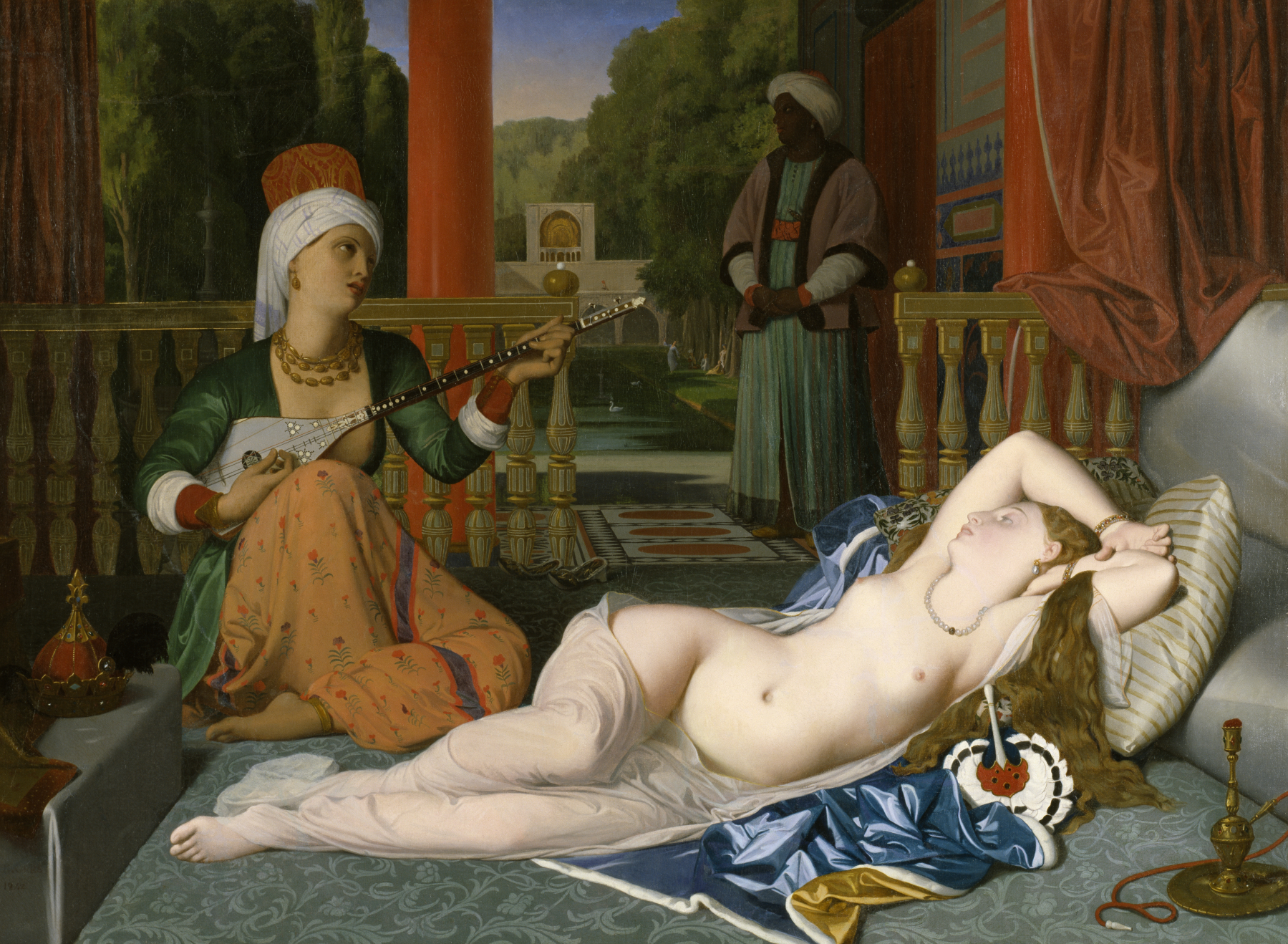
Odalisque with Slave, 1842, Walters Art Museum, Baltimore.

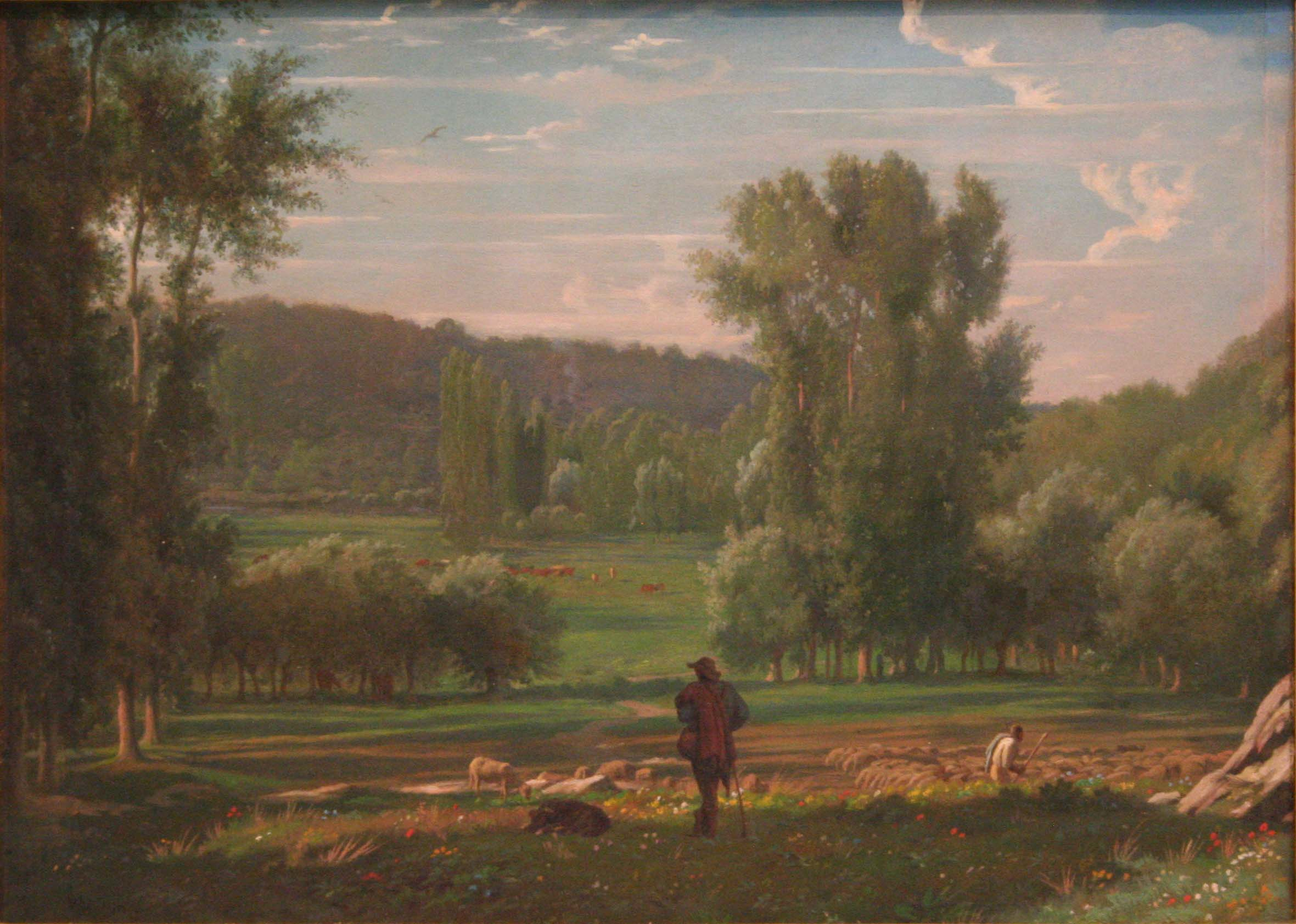
Outskirts of Vienne, musée Fabre, Montpellier

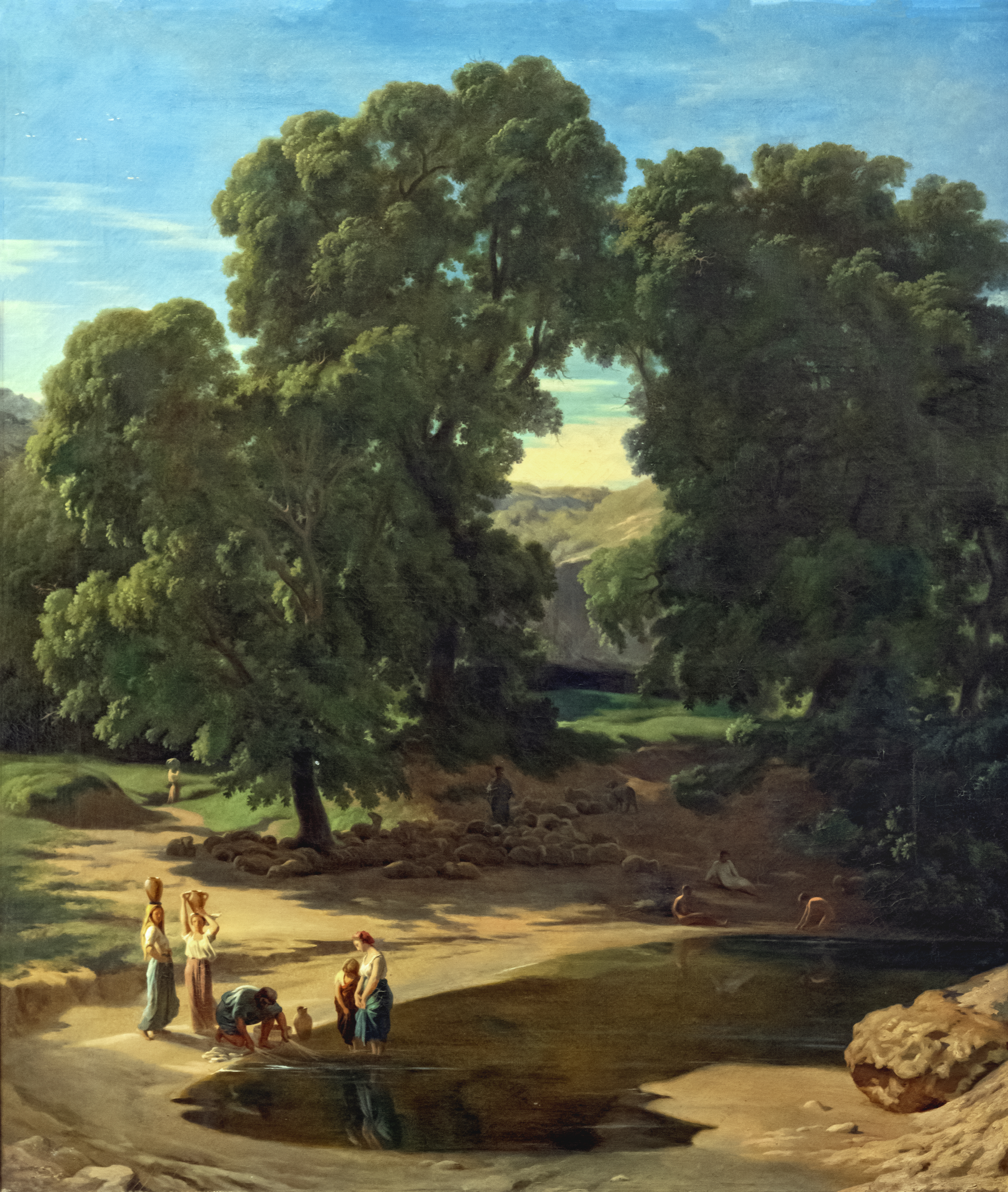
The banks of the Gardon, 1850 Musée Ingres-Bourdelle, Montauban

== Exhibitions ==
- 1984, « Hippolyte, Auguste et Paul Flandrin », musée du Luxembourg in Paris and musée des beaux-arts de Lyon.
- 2007, « Hippolyte et Paul Flandrin, paysages et portraits », musée des beaux-arts de Nantes.
