= Aristide Boucicaut =

French entrepreneur (July 14, 1810 – December 26, 1877)

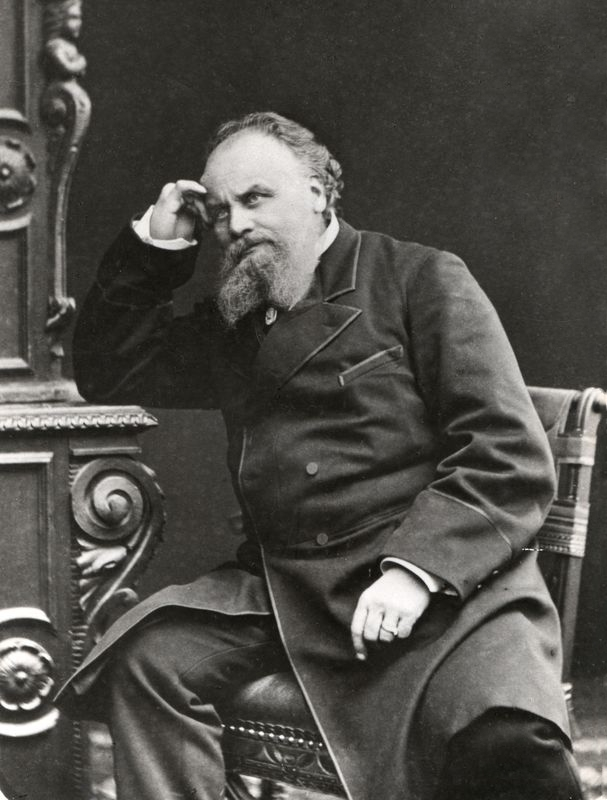
- Aristide Boucicaut
- Born: July 14, 1810; Bellême
- Died: December 26, 1877 (aged 67)
- Occupation: entrepreneur

Aristide Boucicaut (French: [aʁistid busiko]; July 14, 1810 – December 26, 1877) was a French entrepreneur who turned Le Bon Marché into the first modern department store.

== Background ==
Boucicaut was born in Bellême, a commune in the Orne department of France, on 14 July 1810. He was the son of the owner of a small shop that sold fabrics, ribbons and other items for a woman's wardrobe.

== Career ==
=== Early career ===
Boucicaut worked in the family shop, then, at the age of 18, as a street vendor selling fabrics. In 1834 he moved to Paris and went to work in a novelty store on rue de Bac, the Petit Saint-Thomas, which sold women's clothing, hats, fabrics and other items. He began as a salesperson of shawls, but because of his diligence was soon promoted to head of the department.

=== Au Bon Marché Videau ===
In 1848, the Petit Saint-Thomas closed. Boucicaut had made the acquaintance of Paul Videau, who owned a nearby variety store called Au Bon Marché Videau. He became Videau's partner, and put his novel ideas of marketing to work; buying in bulk and selling with very low profit margins; fixed prices; allowing the customers to browse and touch the clothing; seasonal sales; reduced prices on selected items, elaborate window displays, and newspaper advertising. Videau was not comfortable with Boucicault's flamboyant style of salesmanship, and on 31 January 1851 he sold his share of the store to Boucicaut.

=== Le Bon Marché ===
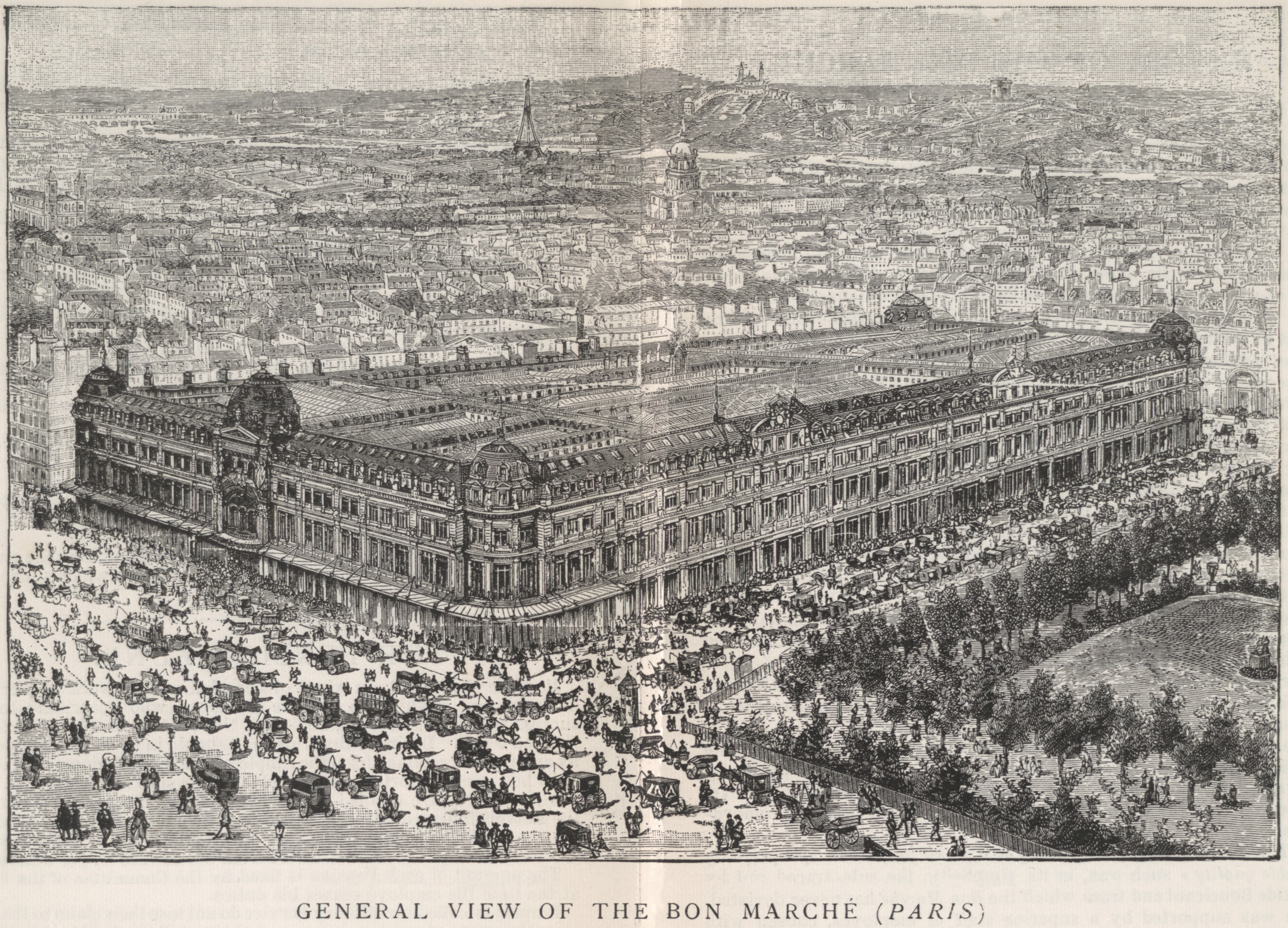
Le Bon Marché (1892)

Between 1852 and 1860, by a combination of deft pricing, public relations and customer service, Boucicaut increased the sales of the store from 500,000 francs to 5 million francs.

Boucicaut introduced a number of marketing innovations; a system of fixed prices with associated discounts instead of the previous system of haggling over prices, then common in dry goods stores; a reading room for husbands while their wives shopped; prizes and entertainment for children; the first mail-order catalog, in 1867; and seasonal sales, including the "white sale", designed to sell sheets and bedding in the winter when sales were slow. Boucicaut also introduced several social innovations for his employees, about half of whom were women. Dormitory housing was provided for the unmarried women employees in rooms on the upper floors of the store. He provided a career track for advancement, from second salesperson to chief of counter to department manager. He established a fund, taken from store profits, to help employees who were sick, and offered pensions to employees who had worked in the store for twenty years.

Boucicaut's next grand project was to build a much larger store. He had met a French entrepreneur, Henry-François Maillard, who had made a fortune in New York, who told Boucicaut about an American businessman named Alexander Turney Stewart who in 1846 had constructed the Marble Palace on Broadway in New York, the first multi-story building devoted entirely to selling merchandise, using an iron frame and large plate glass windows to increase light and space. In 1862, Stewart built an even larger store, eight stories high. Maillard loaned Boucicaut 1.5 million francs to help finance a similar store in Paris. The first stone for the new store was laid on the rue de Sèvres in 1869. The architect was L.A. Boileau, and the framework was of iron, with large glass windows for displays. The building was hardly finished before it was enlarged again, designed by Boileau with the help of the engineering firm of Gustave Eiffel.

== Personal life and death ==
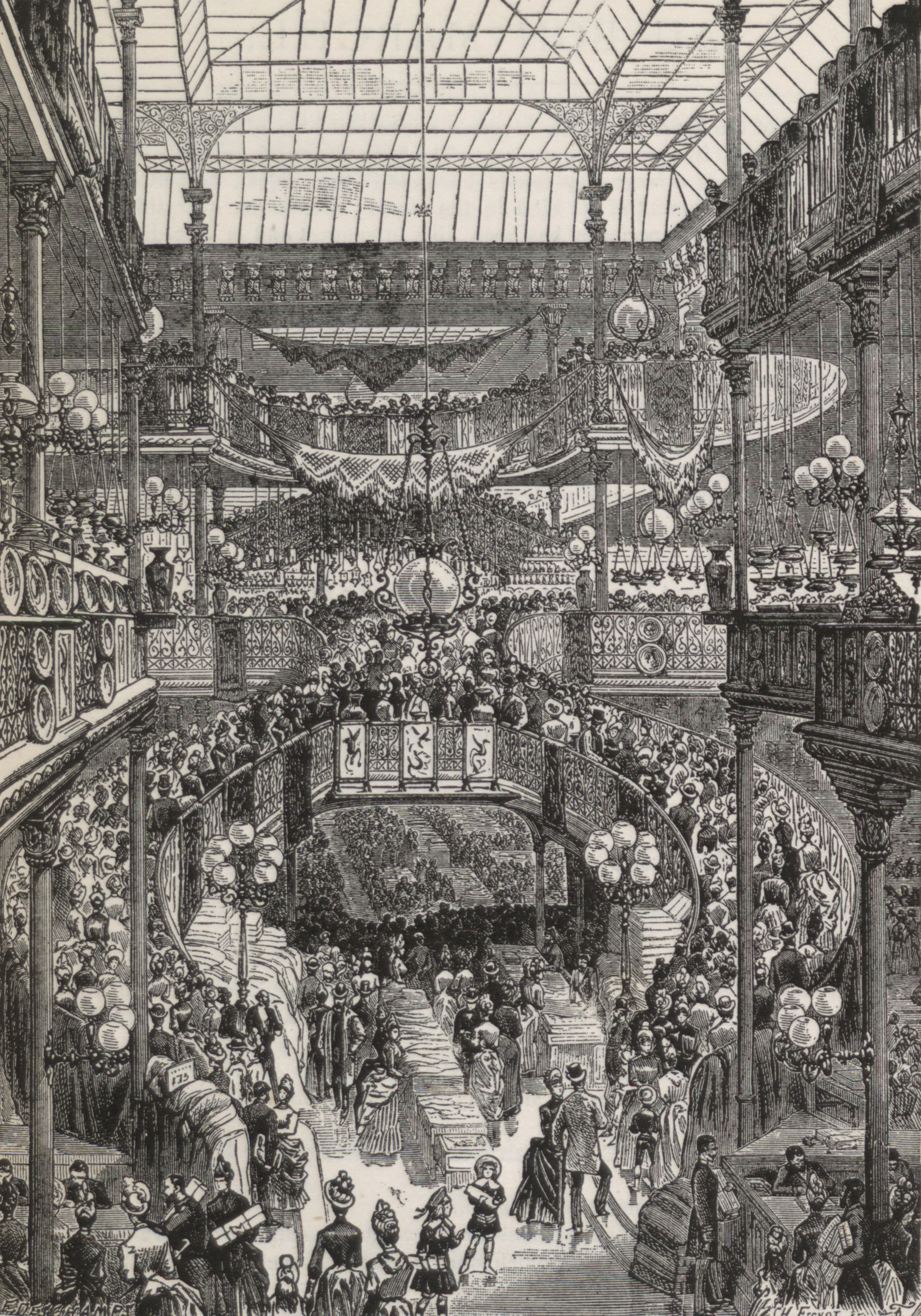
Grand central staircase of Le Bon Marché (1892)

Boucicaut met his future wife, Marguerite Guérin, who was working at a nearby creamery where Boucicaut had his coffee each morning. Boucicault's family objected to a marriage, so she and Boucicaut began to live together in 1836, and had one child born in 1839. They were married in 1848.

He died on December 26, 1877.

The grand building was not finally finished until 1887, ten years after the death of Boucicaut. At the time of Boucicaut's death, the store had 1,788 employees and sales of 72 million francs. With his death his wife became the president of the store, and managed it for ten years, until her death. Their son had died young; Madame Boucicaut left the major part of the family fortune to the Bureau of Public Assistance and Hospitals of Paris. It was used to construct the Boucicaut Hospital, still in existence on the left bank.

== Legacy ==
=== Department stores ===
Le Bon Marché is the progenitor of the modern department store.

=== Literature ===
Émile Zola's novel Au Bonheur des Dames was inspired by the Bon Marché; he wrote to the store in March 1882 and was given a complete tour. The owner of the store in the novel, Octave Mouret, is loosely based on Boucicaut.

The Paradise (TV series) is an adaptation of Zola's novel, thus also based on the life of Boucicaut.

=== Landmarks ===
"Boucicaut" is the main street in his home town of Bellēme.

== See also ==
- Le Bon Marché
- Au Bonheur des Dames (novel)
- How the First Department Store Transformed Society | FULL DOCUMENTARY - YouTube
