= Le Bon Marché =

Department store in Paris, France

Coordinates: 48.8511832°N 2.3243954°E

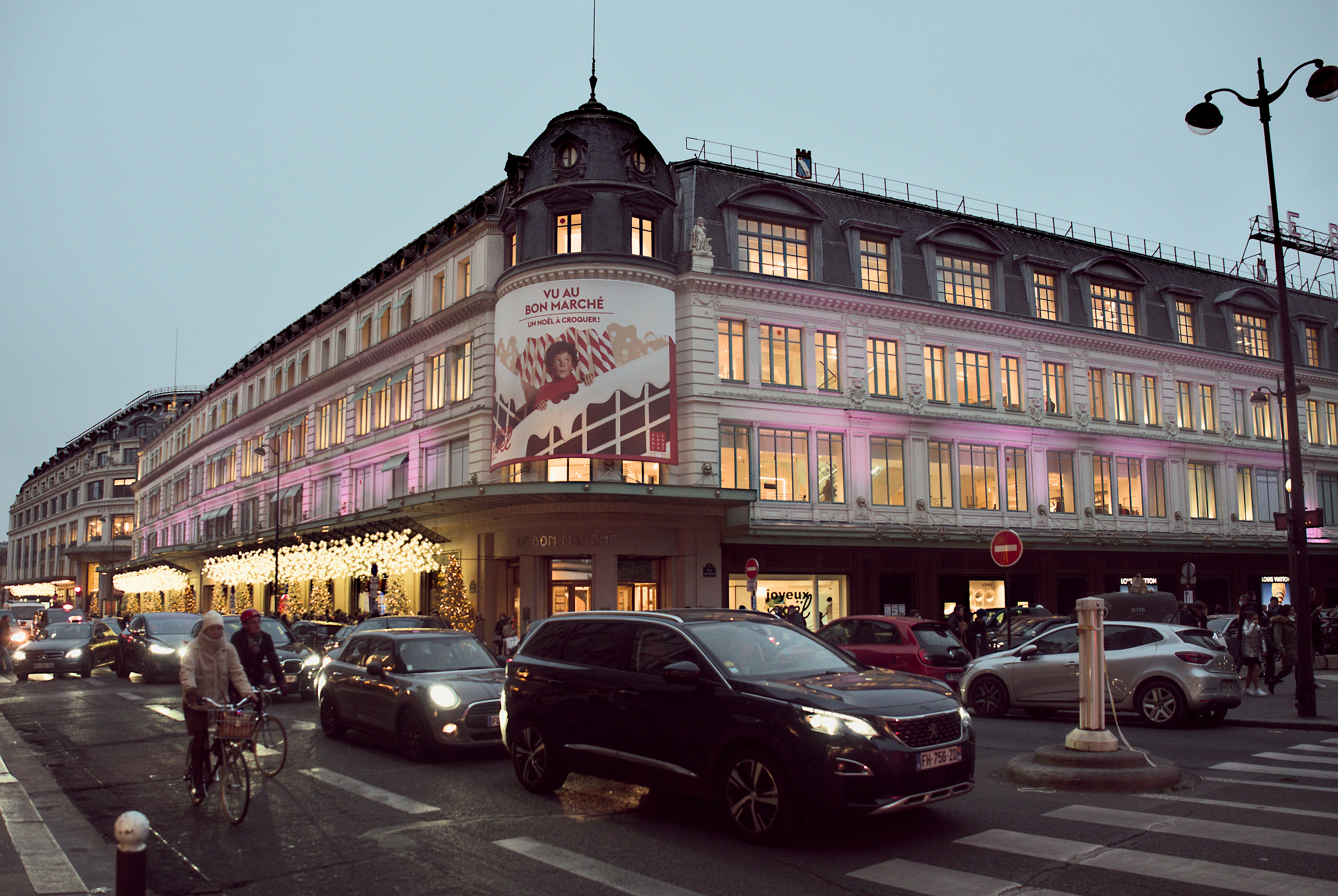
- Le Bon Marché in 2021
- Type: Subsidiary
- Industry: Retail
- Founded: 1838 (188 years ago) in Paris, France
- Founders: Paul Videau; Justin Videau
- Area served: Paris, France
- Parent: LVMH (1987–present)
- Divisions: La Samaritaine
- Website: www.lebonmarche.com

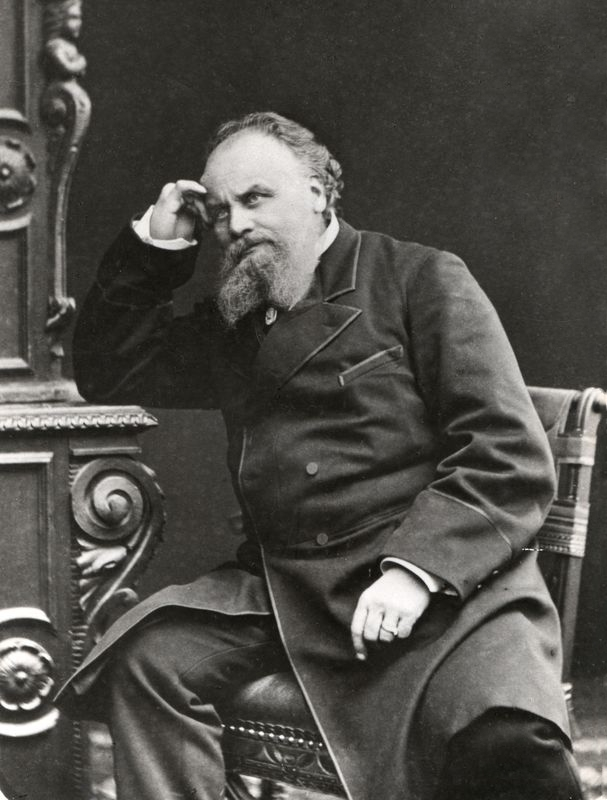
Aristide Boucicaut (1810–1877)

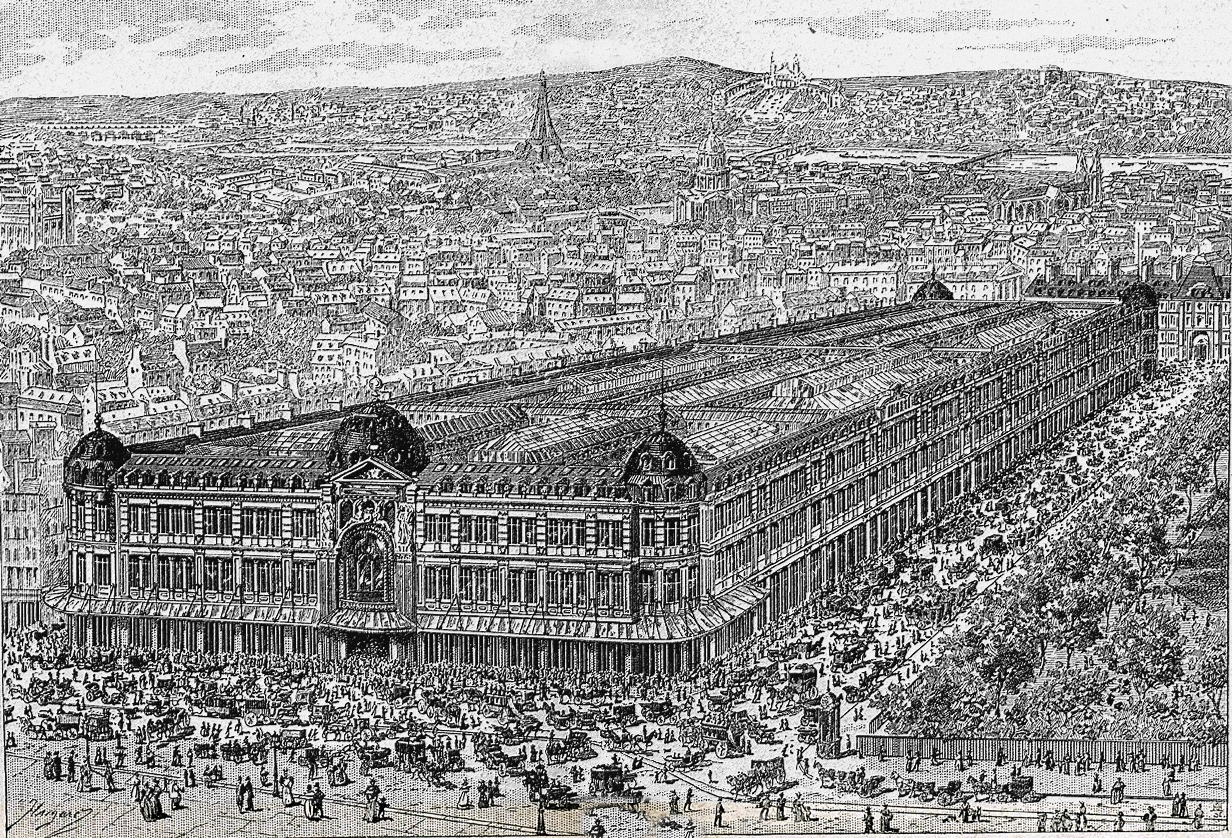
"Au Bon Marché"

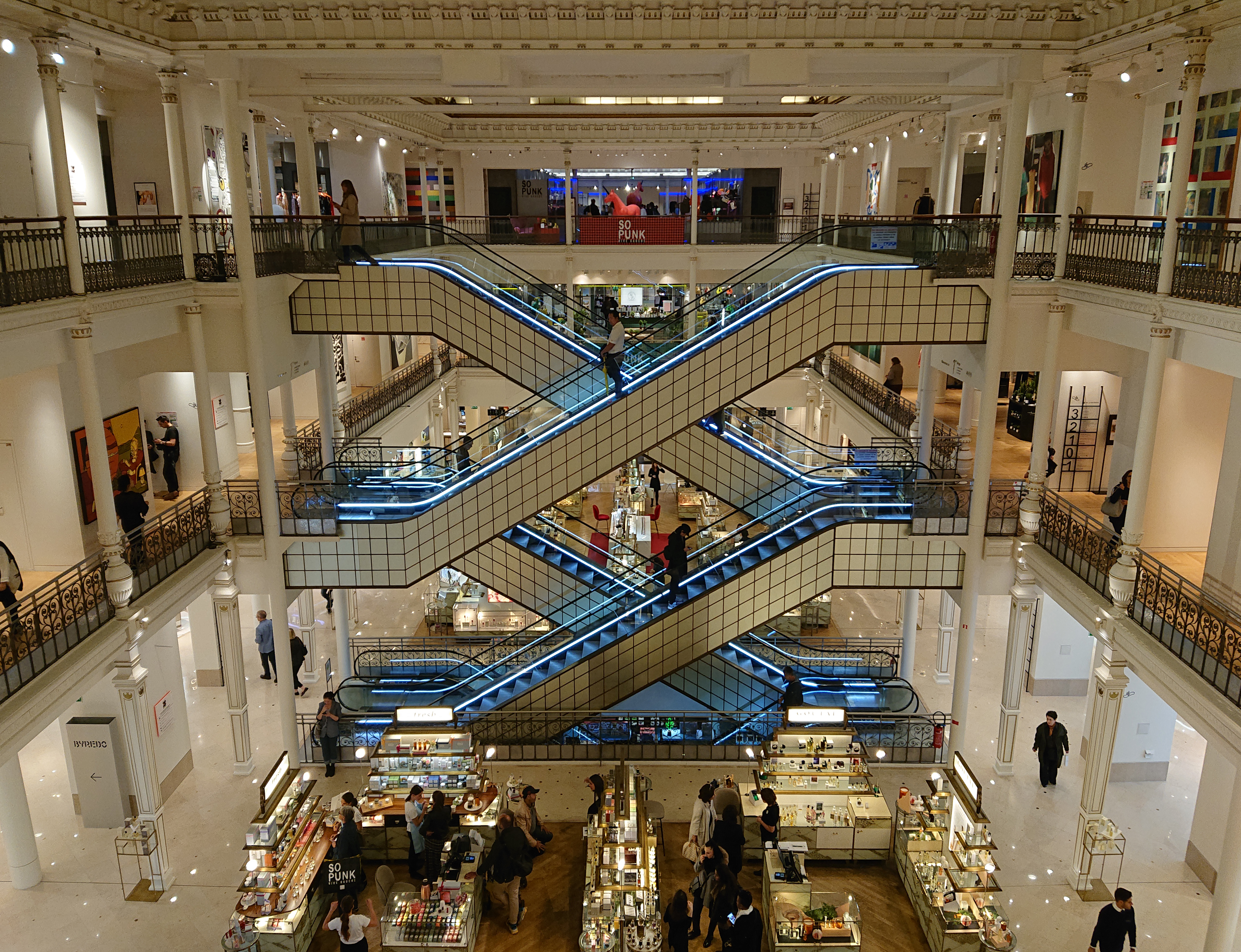
Interior

Le Bon Marché (lit. "the good market", or "the good deal" in French; [l(ə) bɔ̃ maʁʃe]) is a department store in the 7th arrondissement of Paris, France. Founded in 1838 and revamped almost completely by Aristide Boucicaut in 1852, it was one of the first modern department stores. It was a member of the International Association of Department Stores from 1986 to 2011.

Now the property of LVMH, it sells a wide range of high-end goods, including food in an adjacent building at 38, rue de Sèvres, called La Grande Épicerie de Paris.

== History ==
=== Early history ===
In 1838, Au Bon Marché was founded in Paris by the brothers Paul and Justin Videau to sell lace, ribbons, sheets, mattresses, buttons, umbrellas and other assorted goods. The store originally had four departments, twelve employees and a floor space of 300 square metres (3,200 sq ft).

Entrepreneur Aristide Boucicaut became a partner of the store in 1852, and changed the marketing plan, introducing fixed prices and guarantees that allowed exchanges and refunds, the store also now offered a wider variety of merchandise. The use of fixed prices replaced the haggling system which was then commonly used in dry goods stores. With Boucicaut's changes the annual income of the store increased from 500,000 francs in 1852 to five million francs in 1860.

In 1869, a much larger building was designed for the store at 24 rue de Sèvres in Paris's Rive Gauche (Left Bank) this new building was designed by Louis-Auguste Boileau with Alexandre Laplanche ornamenting Boileau's ironwork. Louis-Charles Boileau son of Louis-Auguste Boileau also continued designing for the store in the 1870s. The store was expanded again in 1872 with the help of the engineering firm of Gustave Eiffel, creator of the Eiffel Tower. The floor space of the store had increased from 300 m^{2} (3,200 sq ft) in 1838 to 55,000 m^{2} (590,000 sq ft) and the number of employees had risen to 1,888 by 1879.

By Boucicaut's death in 1877, the store's income had risen from twenty million francs in 1870 to 72 million. After his death management of the store was taken over by his wife, Marguerite Boucicaut. Le Bon Marche had become the go-to destination in Paris for customers wishing to purchase quality lingerie. Boucicaut had become famous for marketing innovations, including a reading room where husbands could wait whilst their wives shopped. Boucicaut relied on extensive newspaper advertising, provided entertainment for children and six million catalogs were sent to customers. By 1880 half the employees of the store were women. Unmarried women employees lived in dormitories on the upper floors.

In the 1920s, Louis-Hippolyte Boileau grandson of the architect Louis-Auguste Boileau who had designed the store in the 1870s worked on an extension of the store. On 31 August 1959, a branch store was opened in Caen. This store was later closed in 1989 and sold to Printemps. In 1974, the branch store in Metz was sold to Printemps.

=== Under LVMH ===
In 1984, Bernard Arnault purchased Le Bon Marché and in 1987 the company became a founding member of Arnault's group LVMH.

== Operations ==
In 1922, when the decorative arts were at their high point in France, the Pomone design and decorating department was established, following the trend of other Parisian department stores. From 1923 to 1928, Paul Follot (1877–1941) was its director, followed by René-Lucien Prou (1889–1948) and Albert-Lucien Guénot (1894–1993) up to 1955. Today's home-furnishings inventory primarily consists of brand names but not white goods.

== Influence ==
The building inspired the design of the Bon Marche store in Sydney, designed by Arthur Anderson, as well as the Galerias Pacifico shopping centre in Buenos Aires, originally called Argentine Bon Marché. In Liverpool, department store entrepreneur David Lewis opened the Bon Marché in 1878 on Bassnett Street, directly inspired by a visit to Le Bon Marché in Paris, and until 1914 his delivery vans were painted in the same striped colours as the Paris store. The store was rebuilt 1912-1918 by Lewis's company architect, Gerald de Courcy Fraser, and continued trading until 1961.

Émile Zola's novel Au Bonheur des Dames was inspired by the story of Le Bon Marché.

== Buildings ==
Le Bon Marché consists of three buildings separated by the rue du Bac and rue de Babylone:

Building	Above- ground floors	Basement floors	Total surface area m²	SHON*^{(fr)} m²	Retail SHON* m²	Selling floor + stock- rooms m²	Ground m²
24, rue de Sèvres	6	3	58,433	55,213	45,341	27,821	9,708
26-38, rue de Sèvres	6	2	30,218	27,328	13,853		4,372
16, rue de Babylone				19,819			2,672
Total				102,360			16,752

*SHON = surface area minus that of the stairs, lifts, unusable ceiling spaces, roof terraces, open-air terraces, balconies, corridors and garages; less a further 5% for insulation.

== See also ==
- La Samaritaine
- Galerías Pacífico
- Galeries Lafayette
- Foy & Gibson
