= Octave (given name) =

Octave (French pronunciation: [ɔktav]) is a given name. Notable people with the name include:

- Octave de Gaulle, French industrial designer
- Octave Boudouard (1872–1923), French chemist
- Octave Chanute (1832–1910), French-born American railway engineer and aviation pioneer
- Octave Crouzon (1874–1938), French neurologist
- Octave Dayen (1906–1987), French cyclist
- Octave Dua (1882–1952), Belgian operatic tenor
- Octave Duboscq (1868–1943), French zoologist, mycologist and parasitologist
- Octave Féré (1815–1875), French writer
- Octave Fortin (1842–1927), Canadian clergyman
- Octave Garnier (1889–1912), French anarchist and founding member of the infamous Bonnot Gang
- Octave Gengou (1875–1957), Belgian bacteriologist
- Octave Gréard (1828–1904), French educator
- Octave Lapize (1887–1917), French cyclist
- Octave Lebesgue (1857–1933), French journalist and writer
- Octave Levenspiel (1926–2017), American professor of chemical engineering
- Octave Lignier (1855–1916), French botanist
- Octave Mannoni (1899–1989), French psychoanalyst and author
- Octave Maus (1856–1919), Belgian art critic, writer, and lawyer
- Octave Merlier (1897–1996), French linguist of Greek
- Octave Mirbeau (1848–1917), French journalist
- Octave Penguilly L'Haridon (1811–1872), French painter
- Octave Pirmez (1832–1883), Belgian author born in Châtelineau
- Octave Pradels (1842–1930), French poet, novelist, vaudevilliste and lyricist
- Octave Tassaert (1800–1874), French painter
- Octave Terrillon (1844–1895), French physician and surgeon
- Octave Uzanne (1851–1931), French bibliophile, writer, publisher, and journalist

== See also ==
- Octave (disambiguation)#People
