= Hôtel d'Uzès =

Hôtel d'Uzès may refer to:

- Hôtel d'Uzès (Paris), a hôtel particulier located in Tonnerre, Yonne
- Hôtel d'Uzès (Tonnerre), hôtel particulier located in Paris
