= Chaput =

French Surname

Chaput is a surname of French origin. Notable people with the surname include:

- Charles J. Chaput (born 1944), Roman Catholic archbishop emeritus of Philadelphia
- Henri Chaput (1857–1919), French surgeon
- Jean Chaput (1893–1918), French World War I flying ace
- Jean Marc Chaput (1910–1974), Canadian politician
- Marcel Chaput (1918–1991), Canadian politician
- Maria Chaput (born 1942), Canadian senator
- Michael Chaput (born 1992), Canadian hockey player
- Solange Chaput-Rolland (1919–2001), Canadian journalist, writer, and senator
- Stefan Chaput (born 1988), Canadian hockey player
- Eric Chaput (born 2000) Canadian International Trade Advisor
