= Boudouard reaction =

Disproportionation of CO into CO2 and elemental carbon

The Boudouard reaction, named after Octave Leopold Boudouard, is the redox reaction of a chemical equilibrium mixture of carbon monoxide and carbon dioxide at a given temperature. It is the disproportionation of carbon monoxide into carbon dioxide and graphite or its reverse:

2 CO ⇌ CO_{2} + C

Boudouard-Equilibrium at 1 bar abs. calculated with 2 different methods

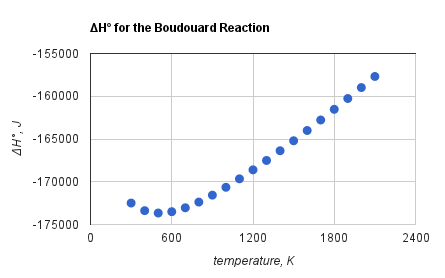
Standard enthalpy of the Boudouard reaction at various temperatures

The Boudouard reaction, which forms carbon dioxide and carbon, is exothermic at all temperatures. However, the standard enthalpy of the Boudouard reaction becomes less negative with increasing temperature, as shown to the side.

While the formation enthalpy of CO_{2} is higher than that of CO, the formation entropy is much lower. Consequently, the standard free energy of formation of CO_{2} from its component elements is almost constant and independent of the temperature, while the free energy of formation of CO decreases with temperature. At high temperatures, the forward reaction becomes endergonic, favoring the (exergonic) reverse reaction toward CO, even though the forward reaction is still exothermic.

The effect of temperature on the extent of the Boudouard reaction is indicated better by the value of the equilibrium constant than by the standard free energy of reaction. The value of log_{10}(K_{eq}) for the reaction as a function of temperature in Kelvin (valid between 500–2200 K) is approximately:

$$\log_{10}(K_{\rm eq}) = \frac{9141}{T} + 0.000224 T - 9.595$$

log_{10}(K_{eq}) has a value of zero at approx. 975 K.

The implication of the change in K_{eq} with temperature is that a gas containing CO may form elemental carbon if the mixture cools below a certain temperature. The thermodynamic activity of carbon may be calculated for a CO/CO_{2} mixture using the partial pressures of each species and the value of K_{eq}. For instance, in a high temperature reducing environment, such as that created for the reduction of iron oxide in a blast furnace or the preparation of carburizing atmospheres, carbon monoxide is the stable oxide of carbon. When a gas rich in CO is cooled to the point where the activity of carbon exceeds 1, the Boudouard reaction can occur. Carbon monoxide then tends to disproportionate into carbon dioxide and graphite, which forms soot.

In industrial catalysis, this is not just an eyesore; sooting (also called coking) can cause serious, even irreversible, damage to catalysts and catalyst beds. This is a problem in the catalytic reforming of petroleum and the steam reforming of natural gas.

The reaction is named after the French chemist Octave Leopold Boudouard (1872–1923), who investigated this equilibrium in 1905.

== Uses ==
Although the damaging effect of carbon monoxide on catalysts is undesirable, this reaction has been used in producing graphite flakes, filamentous graphite and lamellar graphite crystallites, as well as producing carbon nanotubes. In graphite production, catalysts used are molybdenum, magnesium, nickel, iron and cobalt, while in carbon nanotube production, molybdenum, nickel, cobalt, iron and Ni-MgO catalysts are used.

The Boudouard reaction is an important process inside a blast furnace. The reduction of iron oxides is not achieved by carbon directly, as reactions between solids are typically very slow, but by carbon monoxide. The resulting carbon dioxide undergoes a (reverse) Boudouard reaction upon contact with coke carbon.

== Undesired occurrence ==
While the Boudouard reaction is used deliberately in some processes, it is undesired in others. In the gas cooled, graphite moderated British nuclear reactors (Magnox and AGR) reaction between the CO_{2} coolant and the graphite moderator had to be avoided or at least kept to a minimum. As the equilibrium of the reaction shifts in favor of carbon at lower temperatures, this was solved in the Magnox reactor by simply having a lower operating temperature. However, this in turn reduced the achievable thermal efficiency. In the AGR, which was supposed to improve upon the lessons learned from the Magnox, a higher coolant outlet temperature was an explicit design goal (Britain being reliant on coal power at the time, the aim was to achieve the same steam temperature as in coal fired plants) and thus a re-entrant flow of coolant at the lower boiler outlet temperature of 278 °C (532 °F) is utilized to cool the graphite, ensuring that the graphite core temperatures do not vary too much from those seen in a Magnox reactor.
