= Fosse Dionne =

Karst spring in Yonne, France

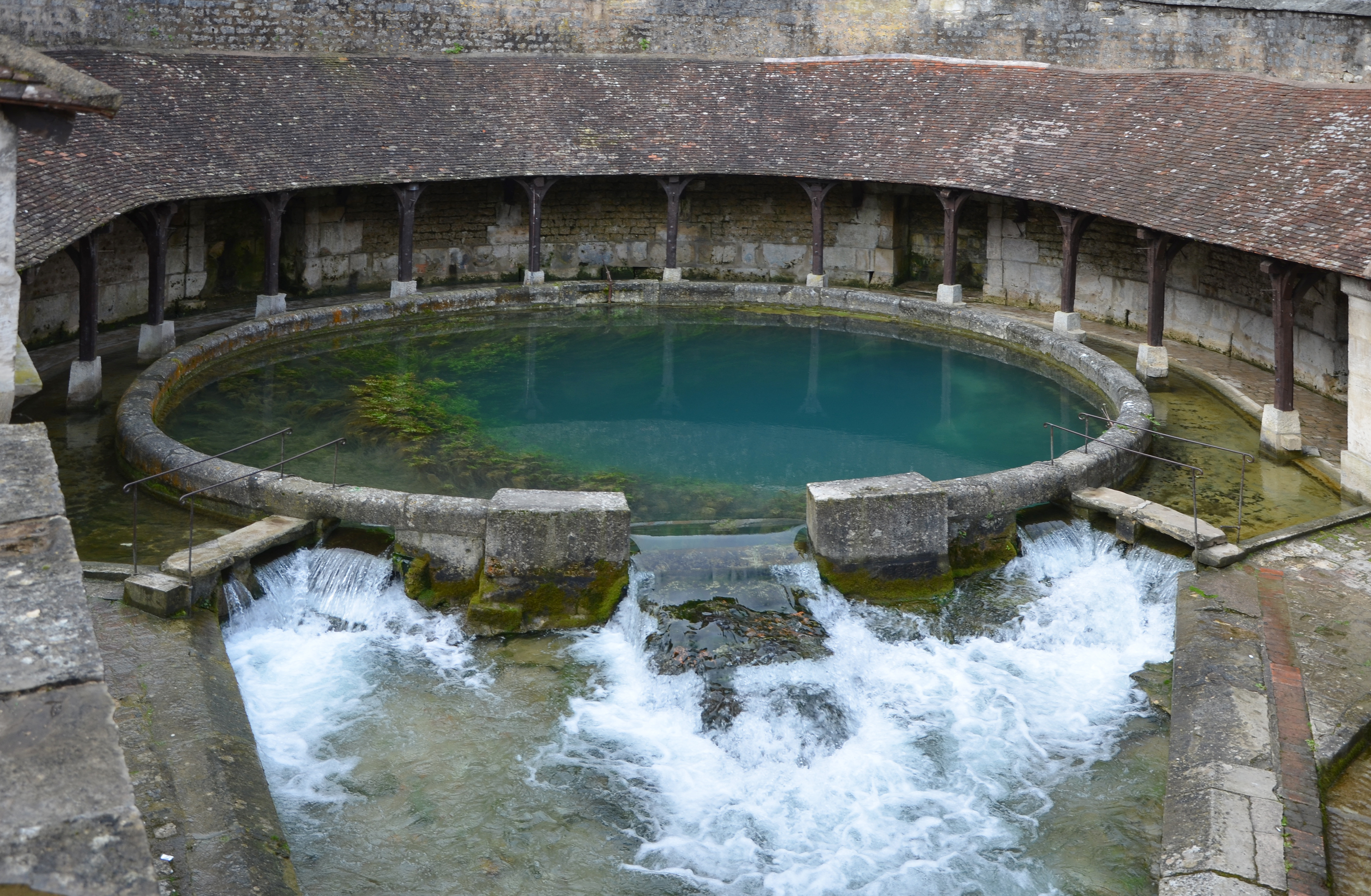

- Location within France
- Interactive map of Fosse Dionne
- Name origin: Fosse is the French word for "pit". The spring was dedicated to an ancient deity from which the name “Divona”, meaning “Divine” evolved into “Dionne”.
- Location: Tonnerre, Yonne, Bourgogne-Franche-Comté, France
- Coordinates: 47°51′24″N 3°58′14″E

The Fosse Dionne is a karst spring, in Tonnerre in the Yonne department of France. It is fed by the rainwater on the surrounding hills as well by at least one subterranean river. The Fosse Dionne is remarkable because of its average daily outflow of 311 litres per second.

It is likely that the spring was the reason for the siting of the village. An elaborate lavoir was built around the spring in the 18th century.

== Hydrogeology ==
The Fosse Dionne is a hydrogeological focal point and resurgent spring. It is fed mainly by the rainwater entering the Jurassic limestone layers of the karstic plateau surrounding Tonnerre. Dye tracing studies have demonstrated that some of the spring's water comes from the Laigne River which disappears underground in the Gouffre de la Garenne at Villaines-en-Duesmois, 43.5 kilometres (27.0 mi) from Tonnerre. There is also a connection between the spring and the Gouffre d'Athée.

The average flow rate is 311 litres per second, but in periods of flood (such as on 15 March 2001) it can reach 3000 litres per second. The average flow varies between 87 litres per second in August and 619 litres per second in January.

== History ==
In the Gallo-Roman period, the Fosse Dionne was used to supply water to the Oppidum of Tornodurum built on the Vieux Châteaux plateau overlooking the commune. The modern settlement of Tonnerre is built around the spring.

=== Legend ===
The oldest reference to the spring is in an account of the life and miracles of St Jean de Rèome (d. 639) written in 659. Two other "lives" were written later, in the 8th and 9th centuries. The legend is recounted in Description de la ville de Tonnerre by Pierre Petitjehan, state notary, written in 1592. The library's edition is an 18th-century copy, made by Joseph Duclon of Courtive in 1773. Petitjehan drew on good sources to write his "Description of the old modern and new city of Tonnerre, antiques of the hospital churches and abbeys and estans, etc.". He not only consults the old archives of the hospital and the city, and those of the ancient abbey of Saint-Michel, but he also records the testimony of elders. Finally, it extracts from the great chronicles (notably that of Gregory of Tours) all the references to the ancient commune of Tonnerre. The legend recounts that the saint dug out and killed a basilisk that inhabited the spring.

=== The lavoir ===
In 1758, Louis d'Éon, father of the Chevalier d'Éon. converted the spring into a lavoir, building a 14-metre wide basin. The washerwomen were protected from the weather by a roof in the form of a “half rotunda” supported by a framework abutting a rubble wall. To avoid pollution, a wall separates the spring from the circular trough used for washing. Fireplaces around the lavoir made it possible to produce the ash needed for cleaning. The structure has been classified as a monument historique since 1920.

== Exploration of the submerged cave ==
The spring consists of a deep basin (hence the name “fosse” [transl. pit]). It opens into a submerged chamber with a 2.5 metre high entrance that is visible from the surface. The flooded cave has been explored by divers despite the difficulties created by narrow passages and a succession of deep siphons requiring frequent decompression stops. The first known exploration was carried out in 1955. The gallery initially descends at an angle of 45° to a depth of 32 meters. Beyond a constriction of 0.8 meters by 0.4 meters, the passage ascends close to the surface before sinking gradually down to a depth of −70 meters at the limit of exploration 370 meters in. As a result of fatal accidents, subterranean diving in the Fosse Dionne is strictly regulated.

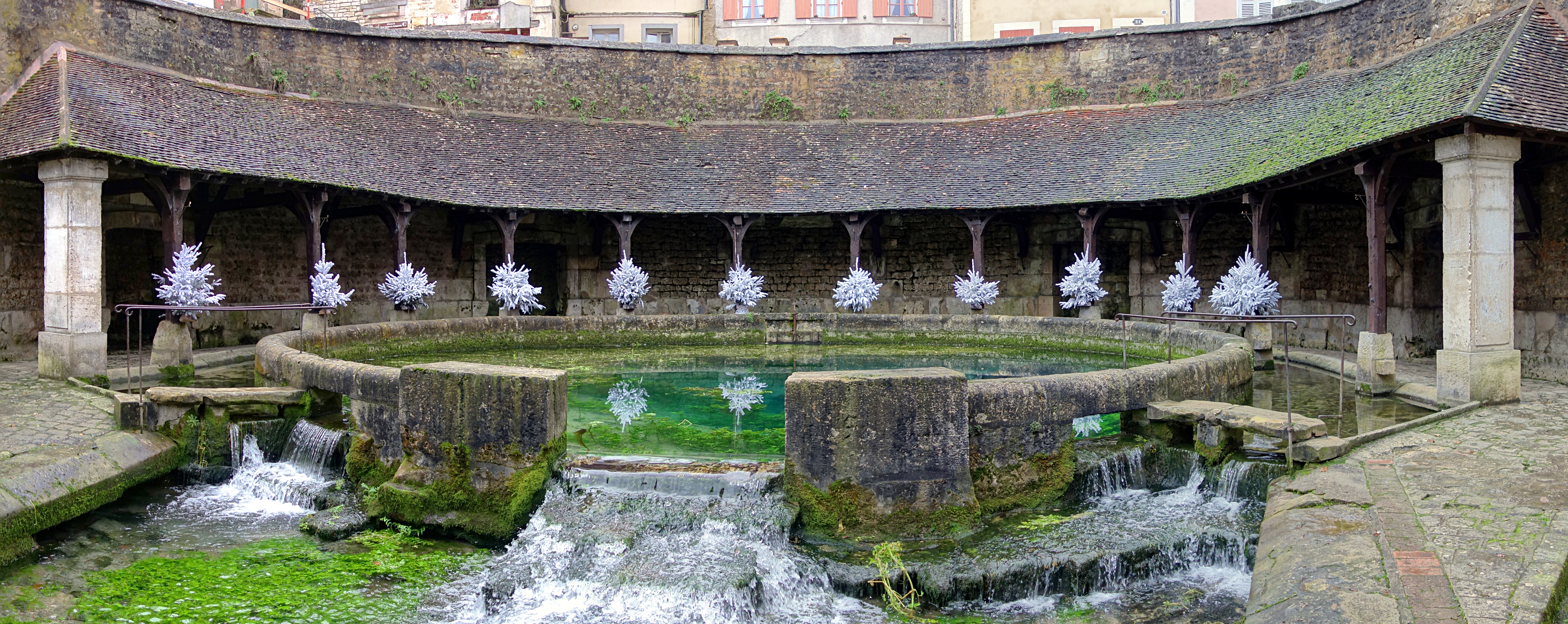
Lavoir at the Fosse Dionne
