= Octave (disambiguation) =

An octave is the interval between one musical pitch and another with half or double its frequency.

Octave may also refer to:

== Arts and entertainment ==
- Octave (album), by The Moody Blues
- Octave (poetry), a verse form consisting of eight lines of iambic pentameter
  - Sicilian octave, a verse form consisting of eight lines of eleven syllables each
  - Ottava rima, an Italian verse form
- Octave, a fictional character in the film Interstella 5555: The 5tory of the 5ecret 5tar 5ystem

== Science and technology ==
- Octave (electronics), a logarithmic unit for ratios between frequencies
- GNU Octave, a high-level computer programming language
- Octave, an IT risk management method
- Octonion, originally octave, in hypercomplex algebra

== People ==
- Octave (given name) including a list of people with the name
- Octave (musician) (born 1963), Romanian rock musician
- Dieuson Octave (born 1997), American rapper known as Kodak Black

== Other uses ==
- Octave, Arizona, a place in the US
- Octave (horse) (foaled 2004), a thoroughbred racehorse
- Octave (liturgy), either the eighth day after a feast, or the whole period of those eight days
- Octave celebration, a religious celebration in Luxembourg
- Octave (unit), a British unit for measuring whisky
- List of storms named Octave, several tropical cyclones

== See also ==
- Octave band, a frequency band that spans one octave
- Law of Octaves, a concept from the history of the development of the periodic table of chemical elements
