= Tonnerre, Yonne =

Commune in north-central France

Tonnerre
- Commune
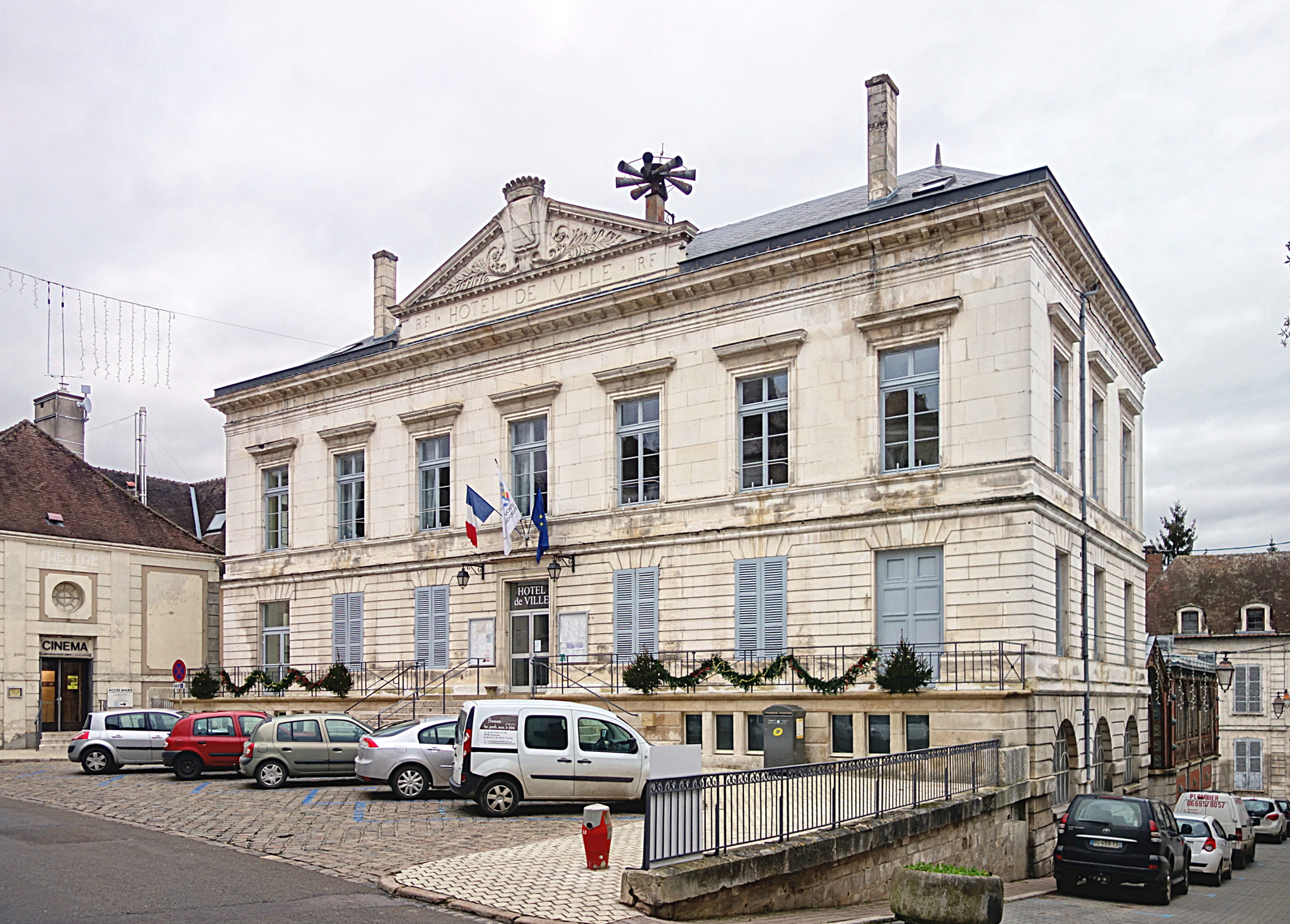
- The town hall

- Coat of arms
- Location of Tonnerre
- Location within France Location within Bourgogne-Franche-Comté
- Coordinates: 47°51′20″N 3°58′27″E
- Country: France
- Region: Bourgogne-Franche-Comté
- Department: Yonne
- Arrondissement: Avallon
- Canton: Tonnerrois

Government
  - Mayor (2020–2026): Cédric Clech
- Area^{1}: 58.27 km^{2} (22.50 sq mi)
- Highest elevation: 323 m (1,060 ft)
- Lowest elevation: 129 m (423 ft)
- Population (2023): 4,261
  - Density: 73.13/km^{2} (189.4/sq mi)
- Time zone: UTC+01:00 (CET)
  - Summer (DST): UTC+02:00 (CEST)
- INSEE/Postal code: 89418 /89700
- Website: www.tonnerre.fr
- ^{1} French Land Register data, which excludes lakes, ponds, glaciers > 1 km^{2} (0.386 sq mi or 247 acres) and river estuaries.

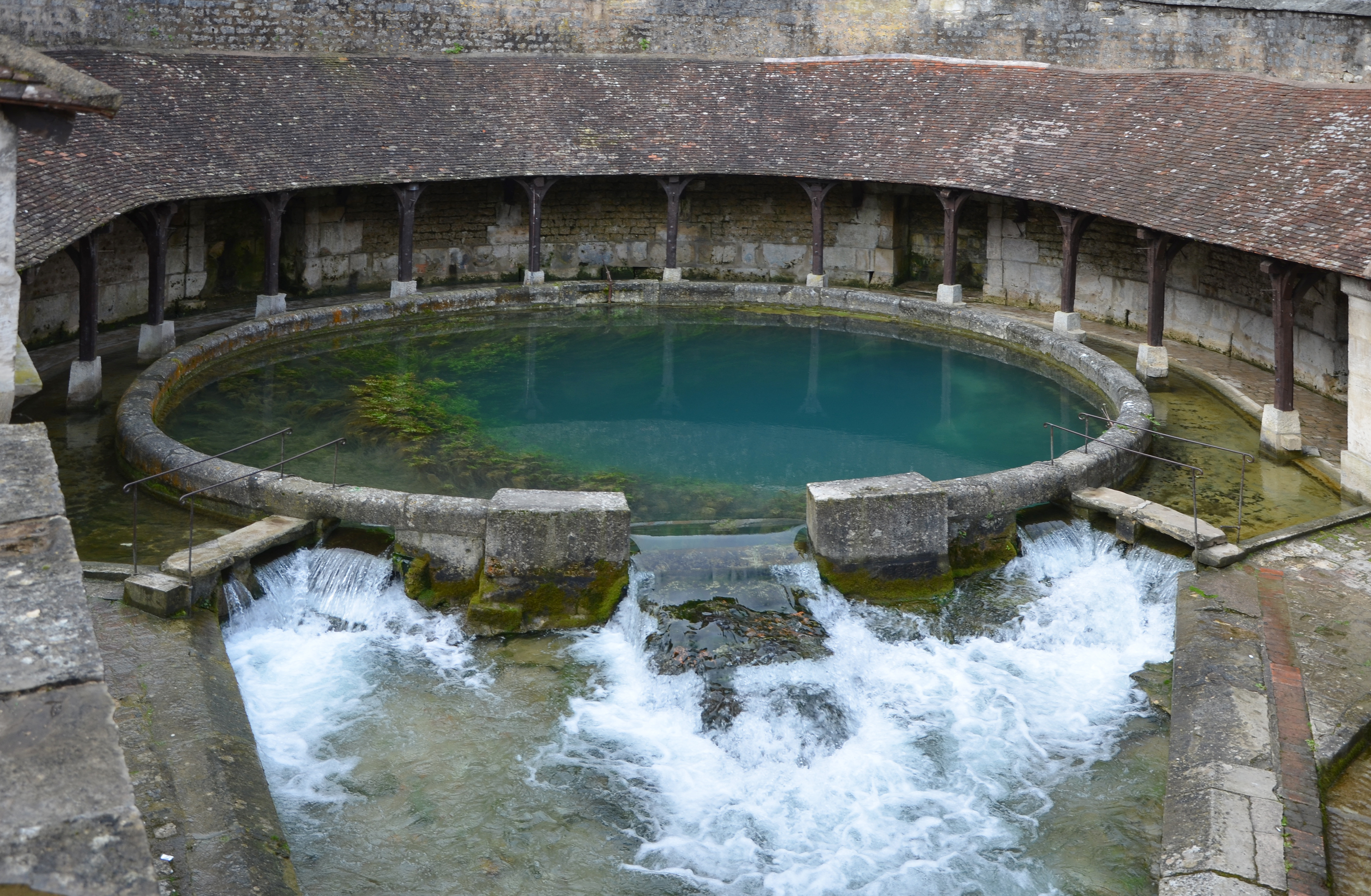
The Fosse Dionne

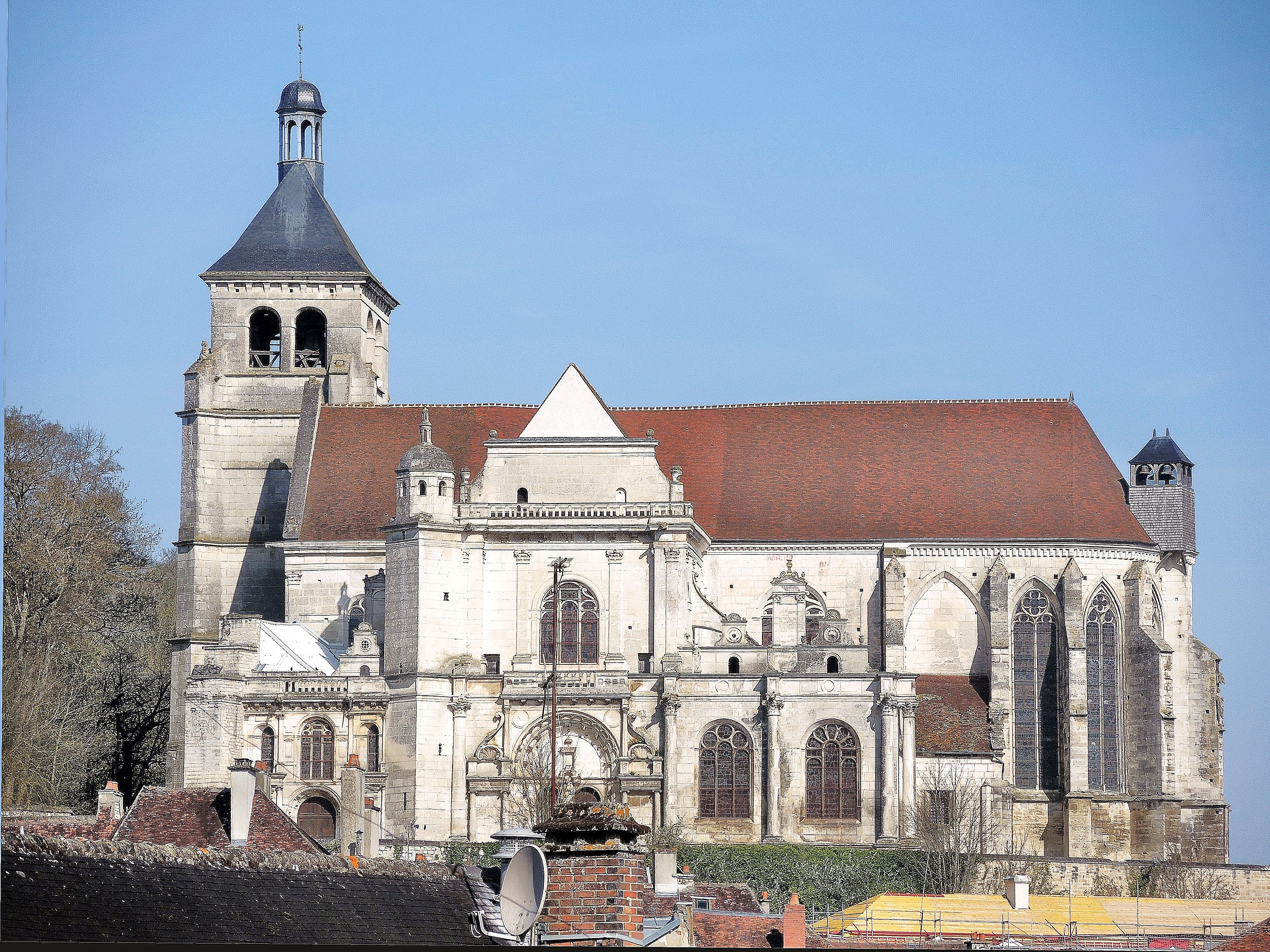
Église Saint Pierre

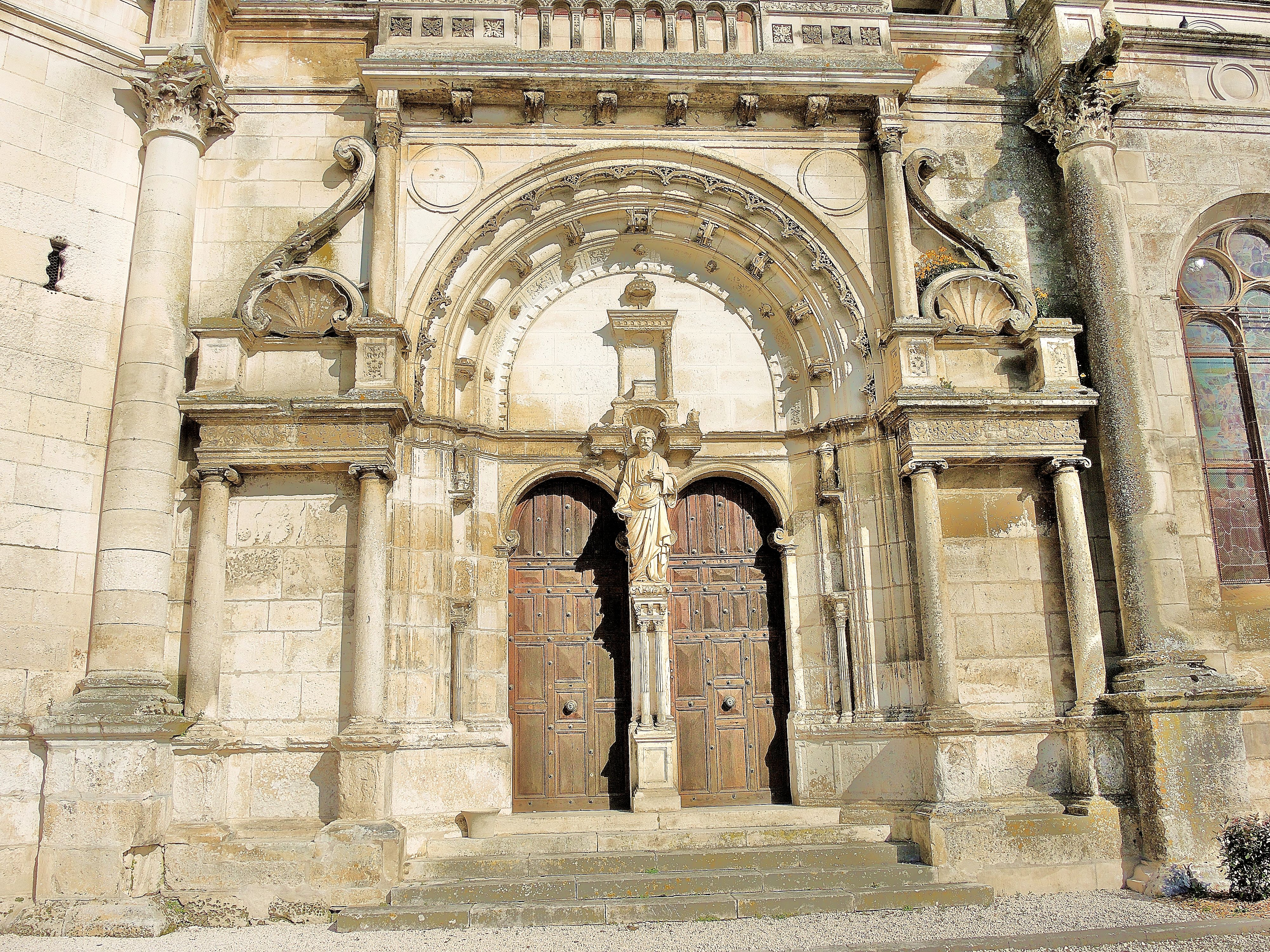
Entrance of the Église Saint Pierre

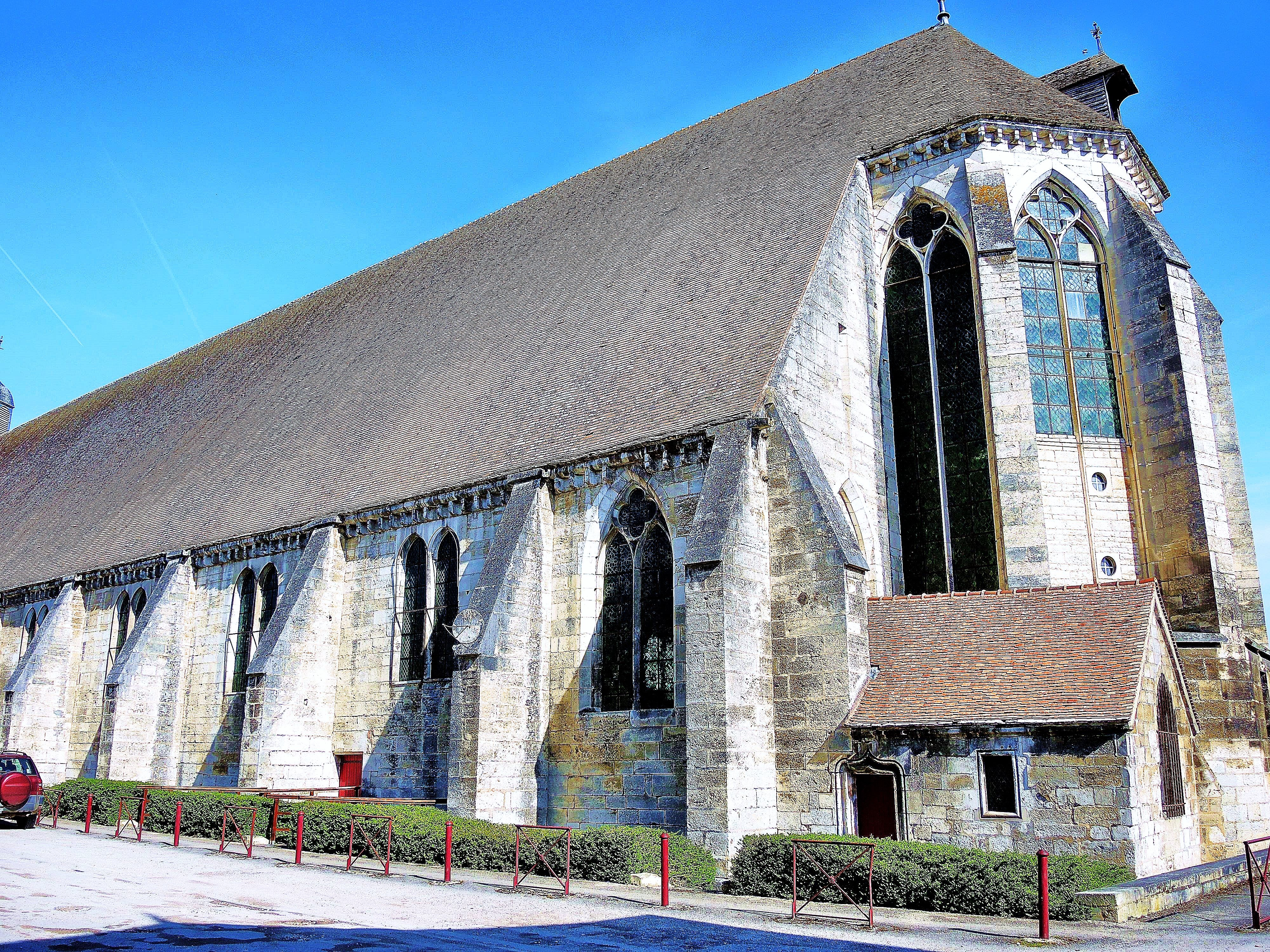
Hôtel-Dieu Notre-Dame des Fontenilles (medieval hospital)

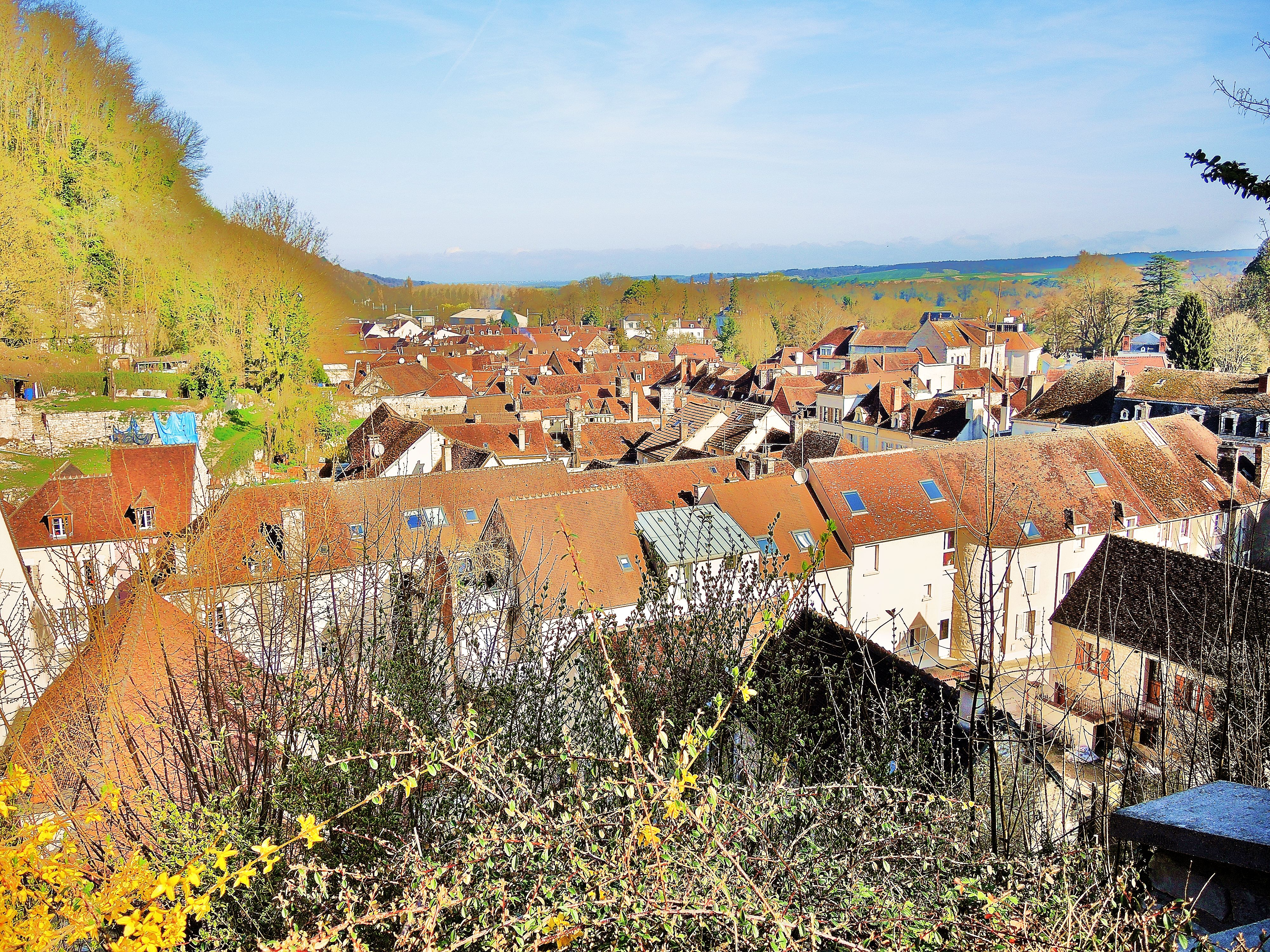
Panoramic view northwest of the city

Tonnerre (French pronunciation: [tɔnɛʁ]) is a commune in the Yonne department in Bourgogne-Franche-Comté in north-central France.

== Geography ==
Straddling the Canal de Bourgogne, the commune is situated at the following crossroads:

- RD 965 (formerly RN 65) linking Auxerre 70 km to the west and Troyes 65 km to the north
- RD 905 (formerly RN 5) linking Sens 70 km to the north and Dijon 125 km to the southeast, an historic route from Paris to Geneva.

== Weather ==
Climate data for Tonnerre (2004–2020 normals, extremes 2004-present)
Month	Jan	Feb	Mar	Apr	May	Jun	Jul	Aug	Sep	Oct	Nov	Dec	Year
Record high °C (°F)	16.4 (61.5)	21.6 (70.9)	26.4 (79.5)	28.7 (83.7)	33.1 (91.6)	40.7 (105.3)	41.2 (106.2)	39.7 (103.5)	35.5 (95.9)	31.1 (88.0)	23.8 (74.8)	18.4 (65.1)	41.2 (106.2)
Mean daily maximum °C (°F)	6.5 (43.7)	8.1 (46.6)	12.3 (54.1)	17.0 (62.6)	19.8 (67.6)	23.9 (75.0)	26.4 (79.5)	25.6 (78.1)	22.0 (71.6)	17.0 (62.6)	10.9 (51.6)	7.2 (45.0)	16.4 (61.5)
Daily mean °C (°F)	3.7 (38.7)	4.4 (39.9)	7.4 (45.3)	11.2 (52.2)	14.3 (57.7)	18.1 (64.6)	20.3 (68.5)	19.5 (67.1)	16.2 (61.2)	12.6 (54.7)	7.7 (45.9)	4.4 (39.9)	11.6 (52.9)
Mean daily minimum °C (°F)	1.0 (33.8)	0.8 (33.4)	2.5 (36.5)	5.4 (41.7)	8.8 (47.8)	12.2 (54.0)	14.1 (57.4)	13.4 (56.1)	10.4 (50.7)	8.1 (46.6)	4.4 (39.9)	1.6 (34.9)	6.9 (44.4)
Record low °C (°F)	−13.0 (8.6)	−14.0 (6.8)	−14.0 (6.8)	−4.4 (24.1)	−0.6 (30.9)	4.1 (39.4)	6.3 (43.3)	4.3 (39.7)	1.7 (35.1)	−3.9 (25.0)	−5.3 (22.5)	−16.6 (2.1)	−16.6 (2.1)
Average precipitation mm (inches)	58.8 (2.31)	53.5 (2.11)	58.5 (2.30)	49.8 (1.96)	80.6 (3.17)	67.6 (2.66)	47.1 (1.85)	65.1 (2.56)	53.1 (2.09)	73.7 (2.90)	61.7 (2.43)	73.4 (2.89)	742.9 (29.25)
Average precipitation days (≥ 1.0 mm)	11.9	11.0	10.9	8.3	11.1	8.8	7.6	8.3	7.5	9.9	11.5	12.5	119.3
Source: Meteociel

== Toponymy ==
During the Roman era, Tonnerre was known as Tornodurum, which was derived from the Lingone word for "fortress". It was the capital of Pagus Tornodorensis. Here, in the valley of the Armançon, the County of Tonnerre was created, which served as a point of passage between Paris and Dijon, during a time when the King of France had designs on the Duchy of Burgundy.

Three etymologies of Tonnerre are rooted in the Celtic era: it is derived from Torn, an obscure local deity; others claim it is from Douros, meaning fortress; yet others say it is connected to a place near the torrent. It is equally likely that the three solutions are one:

- In 1782, newly discovered caves yielded weapons, ornaments, coins, and jewelry linked to the worship of deities.
- The dominant fortress of Tonnerre was located upon the sites "Mont Bellant" and "Vieux Châteaux" which yield many ancient artifacts.
- Amongst the overwhelming evidence of the area's religious heritage is the Fosse Dionne.

== History ==
=== Antiquity ===
In 2005, research at a place called Les Petits Ovis revealed that the site was occupied by a necropolis dating to the end of the Bronze Age. At a place called Terre de Vauplaine burials and cremations from the Bronze Age to the Iron Age have been found.

An oppidum dating to the La Tène period developed on the high part of the City of Tonnerre. Later, a rural Roman Gaul settlement was built whose boundaries are not well-established.

=== Medieval county ===
During this period many tanneries appeared along the banks of the Armançon or near the Fosse Dionne.

==== Dynasty of the native counts ====
Tonnerre was the seat of a County starting in the 10th century. They administered the western edge of the vast bishopric of Langres. Several members of this family rose to rule this bishopric. Its seat may have been in the Bar-sur-Seine area. The counts, known by the charters of the Abbey of Saint-Michel, bear the name Miles. Succession in the 11th century was more chaotic.

A viscount of Tonnerre appeared at the beginning of this century. Under the law, this meant that the owner of the county had rights to other land as well, which imposes the establishment of a viscount (the same problem arose in Joigny in 1080). This viscount was the origin of the Rougemont family.

The last heir to this dynasty was the wife of Guillaume the 11th-century Count of Nevers and Auxerre. Guillaume had great difficulty surviving under the tutelage of his uncle, the Duke of Burgundy who killed his father. The marriage of his younger sister to a son of the Count of Brienne provoked the definitive separation of Tonnerre from the County of Bar-sur-Seine.

==== Dynasty of Nevers-Auxerre (1045–1193) ====
Guillaume de Nevers ruled the county for a long period of time. A provost became the representative of the administration to the Tonnerrois. The tendency of heredity in comital succession is an admitted weakness. The younger son of Guillaume nearly caused an autonomous county to emerge. The county frequently served as dower to dowager countesses. Some families wield great power in the county; especially the Argenteuil and Rougemont families. Some of them were bestowed with the title of viscount due to profitable commercial ventures in Ligny-le-Chatel. This phenomenon touched other parts of the county as well. The lords of Noyers-sur-Serein evaded comital authority and established an independent hold on the border of Auxerre County and former county of Avallon. Feudalism had reached its peak. By the end of this period the city of Tonnerre had grown considerably. The city had two parishes: Notre-Dame and Saint-Pierre. Around 1170, the counts attempted to reassert control of their powerful feudal lords, but only had limited success: they imposed an inheritance tax. Feudalism was deeply entrenched.

==== Dynasty of Courtenay ====
From the late 12th to middle of the 13th century, the city of Tonnerre was the most important community in the County of Nevers-Auxerre and Tonnerre. This period came to an end after the count's business misadventures in the Byzantine Empire. Copying an institution in place in royal domains since 1184, the count divided his dominion into two bailiwicks, both administered by the same bailey. The bailey was largely ineffectual. It could not reign in the powerful local feudal lords, clashed with the bishop of Auxerre and lead to the revolt of Hervé de Donz; all which humiliated Count Pierre de Courtenay. The head of a junior branch of the de Courtenay came to rule the seigniory of Tanlay.

==== Dynasty of Chalon (1308–1463) ====
In the middle of the 13th century, a countess of Tonnerre married the King of Sicily. She founded the Grand Hotel-Dieu: the largest civil monument in Burgundy.

After participating in the division of the County of Nevers-Auxerre and Tonnerre, the Chalon family was given the County of Tonnerre.

As a prelude to the second phase of the Hundred Years' War, the Count of Tonnerre removed a lady-in-waiting from the court of the Duchess of Burgundy. Jean Sans Peur used this as a pretext to wage war against the Count of Tonnerre. Despite the vast difference in the size of their armies, the count managed to delay his ruin. This desperate struggle had a price: the Tonnerrois region was ravaged. The estates of the feudal lords who followed their natural suzerain into battle were plundered by Burgundian nobles. The war between Armagnacs and Burgundians occurred soon afterwards (1411). Tonnerre remained under the control of the Duchy of Burgundy. During the 15th century, the city received new tax institutions: Aids and the Election.

=== French Revolution ===
It was the capital of the Tonnerre District from 1790 to 1795 and the Arrondissement of Tonnerre from 1800 to 1826.

=== World War II ===
The city was the victim of German bombing in June 1940 and Allied bombing on 25 May 1944, which killed 14 people when a church was hit.

== Heraldry ==
Blazon: "Gules a Bend Or"

== List of mayors ==
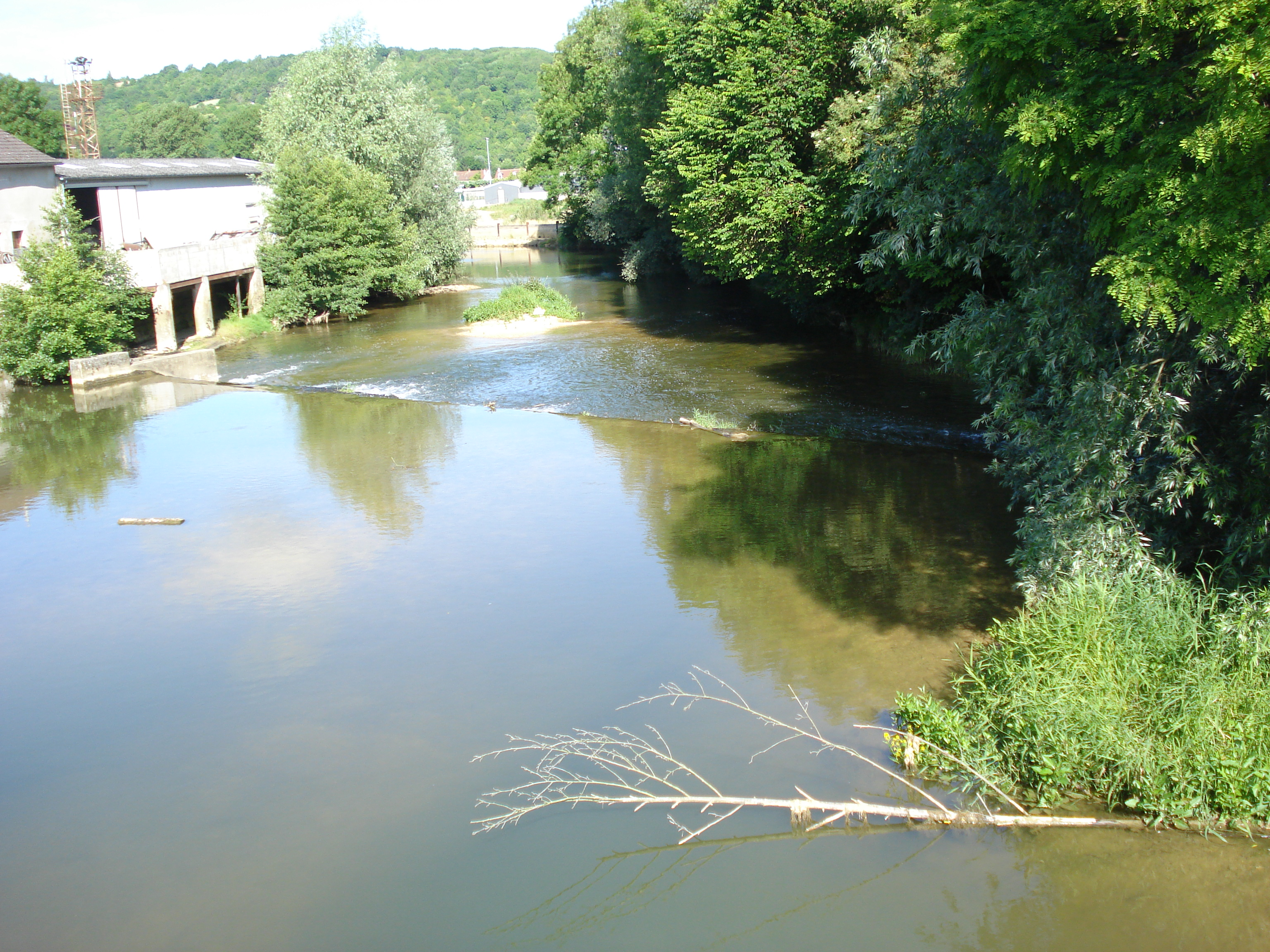
Armançon River near Tonnerre

Term	Name	Party	Description
17??-17??	...	–	–
1791-1791	. Percheron	–	Abbot
about 1780-????	Claude Bazile	–	Warrant Officer
18??-18??	...	–	–
Apr 1800–????	Jacques-François Barbuat of the Maisons-Rouges of Boisgérard	–	Brigadier General, appointed
18??-18??	...	–	–
Jan 1856–????	. Hardy	–	–
18??-18??	...	–	–
18??-Sep 1870	. Montreuil	–	–
1870–1872	Jules-François Hardy	–	Judge, appointed, acting
1872–187?	...	–	–
1881–188?	.Gaupillat	–	–
188?–1899	...	–	–
1899–1927	Edmond Jacob	–	–
1927–1929	Catherine	–	–
1929–1945	Maurice Cerceau	–	–
1945–1965	Roger Ricand	–	Auctioneer
1965–1971	Rene Gérard	–	Pharmacist
1971–1975	Jacques Suisse	–	Surgeon
1975–1977	Jean Cadieu	–	Physician
1977–1989	Georges Roze, former member of the French Resistance	–	Executive, Electricité de France (EDF)
1989–1998	Henri Nallet	Socialist Party (France)	Deputy (Chamber of Deputies); Minister of State
1998–2001	André Fourcade	Socialist Party (France)	Primary School Teacher
2001–2008	Raymond Hardy	–	Auditor
2008–2014	André Fourcade	Socialist Party (France)	Primary School Teacher
2014–Present	Dominique Aguilar	Union of Democrats and Independents	Public Finance Officer

== Demographics ==
Historical population

Year	Pop.	±% p.a.
1793	4,012	—
1800	4,261	+0.86%
1806	4,190	−0.28%
1821	4,023	−0.27%
1831	4,242	+0.53%
1836	4,271	+0.14%
1841	4,184	−0.41%
1846	4,427	+1.14%
1851	4,672	+1.08%
1856	4,692	+0.09%
1861	4,789	+0.41%
1866	5,429	+2.54%
1872	5,332	−0.30%
1876	5,536	+0.94%
1881	5,681	+0.52%
1886	5,095	−2.15%
1891	4,734	−1.46%
1896	4,749	+0.06%
1901	4,685	−0.27%

Year	Pop.	±% p.a.
1906	4,522	−0.71%
1911	4,384	−0.62%
1921	4,373	−0.03%
1926	4,463	+0.41%
1931	4,484	+0.09%
1936	4,433	−0.23%
1946	4,237	−0.45%
1954	4,345	+0.32%
1962	5,595	+3.21%
1968	5,834	+0.70%
1975	6,336	+1.19%
1982	6,007	−0.76%
1990	6,008	+0.00%
1999	5,979	−0.05%
2007	5,274	−1.56%
2012	5,060	−0.83%
2017	4,575	−2.00%
2023	4,261	−1.18%

Source: EHESS and INSEE (1968–2023)

== Economy ==
- Tonnerre Area Development Center (French: Centre de développement du Tonnerrois), abbreviated CDT, is a joint venture of the Yonne Area Chamber of Commerce and Industry (French: chambre de commerce et d'industrie de l'Yonne) or CCI Yonne for short, and the Chamber of Trade.
- Tonnerre Area Business Incubator (French: Hôtel d'entreprises du Tonnerrois), managed by CCI Yonne: location of workshops and offices for designers and small business.

== Quality of life ==
2 Flowers out of 4 (in the city category).

Communities obtain the label of Blooming City (French: Ville fleuri) or Blooming Village (French: Village fleuri) by participating in the Competition for Cities and Villages in Bloom (French: Concours des villes et villages fleuris) which aims to promote quality of life through community greening across France.

== Historical sites and monuments ==
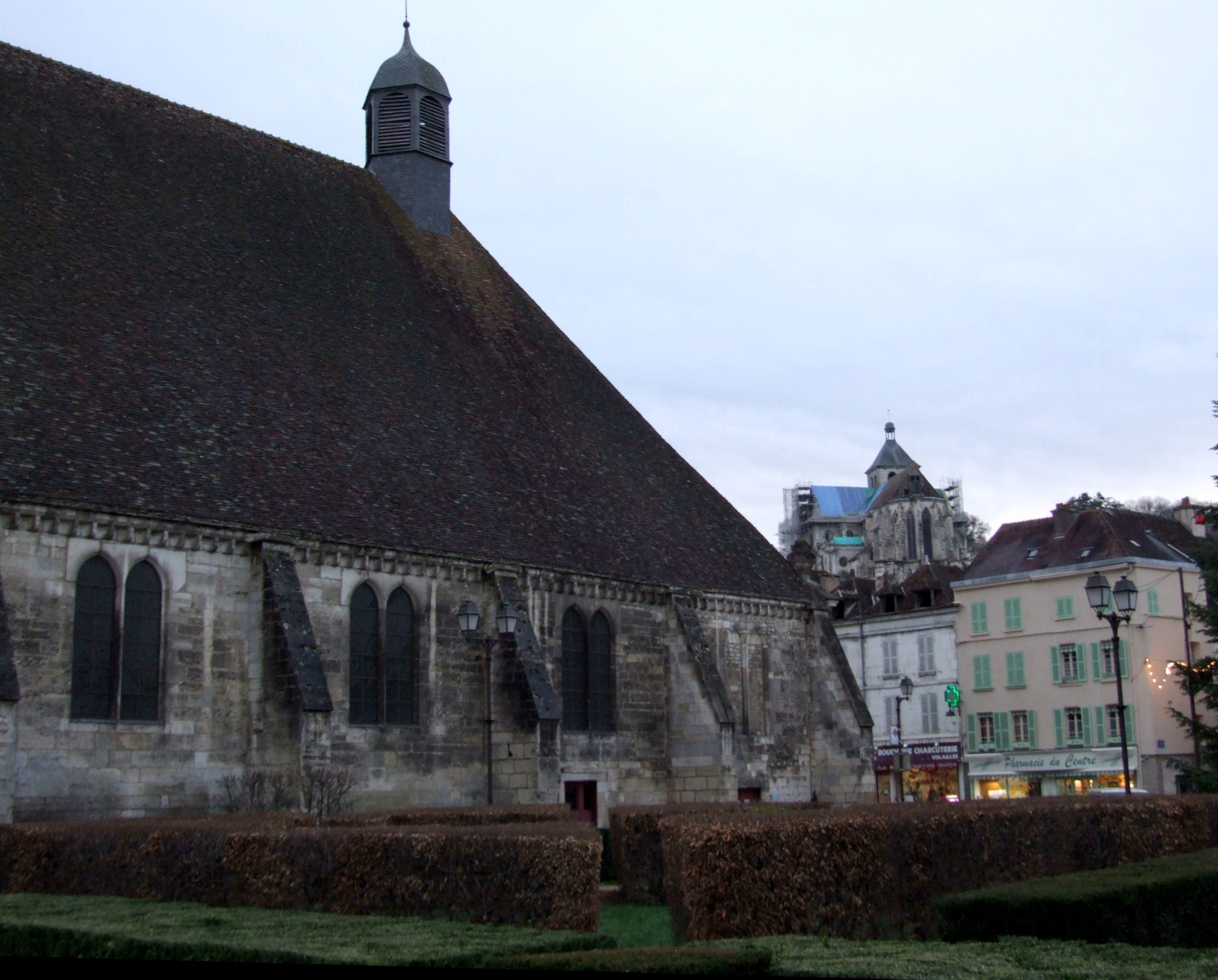
Tonnerre – Hotel-Dieu 6

- Tonnerre Burgundy vineyard
- The Fosse Dionne, source of the high-flow-rate Vaucluse spring. A circular wash basin and Burgundy-tile-clad gallery was added in the 18th century. This tourist curiosity was dedicated to ancient deity from which the name "Divona", meaning "Divine" evolved into "Dionne".
- The Old Hospital or Hôtel-Dieu Notre-Dame des Fontenilles, founded in 1293 by Marguerite of Burgundy, it was built in just three years. It was of the first and largest hospitals in Medieval France. The building's dimensions are impressive: it has a 4,500-square-meter (50,000 sq ft) roof (originally covered in glazed tiles), main hall that is 90 meters (300 ft) long by 18.2 meters (60 ft) wide by 27 meters (89 ft) high. The ceiling is paneled and the enormous framework is in the form of a hull of an overturned ship. Up to 40 patients could be treated. The chapel contains the tomb of Marguerite of Burgundy, the mausoleum of François Michel Le Tellier de Louvois and a 15th-century shrine. There is also an 18th-century chaise longue and museum.
- Église Saint-Pierre, with its Baroque-style façade, dominates the city. Originally built in the 9th century, it has undergone many changes. It was nearly destroyed in a fire in 1556, which ravaged Tonnerre. Inside, one will find a pipe organ whose console dates to 1616, a pulpit that was built in 1712–1713 and stained-glass windows that date to the 16th century and restored in 2003. Nothing remains of the 11th century chapel.
- Église Notre-Dame de Tonnerre is a 12th-century gothic church. It was severely damaged by bombing during World War II.
- Hôtel d'Uzès, the childhood home of Charles de Beaumont, Chevalier d'Éon. It has been the property of the savings bank since 1879. Heavily restored in 1888, it is decorated with frescos by the painter Georges Henri Carré. There many other private mansions in Tonnerre.
- Ursuline Convent (until 1789) at Place Edmond-Jacob, currently a lycée (high school).
- Ursuline Convent (starting in 1805) on Rue Pasteur, is now attached to the lycée.
- Crypt of Saint Catherine, which contains Romanesque vaults, was built in the 12th century.
- Covered market, inaugurated in 1904, built in late 19th- and early 20th-century architectural style, in the iron-and-glass style of Victor Baltard.
- City hall, which overlooks the covered market.
- Château Vaulichères, former property of the House of Clermont-Tonnerre.
- The municipal museum and the library.
- The Promenade of the Pâtis.
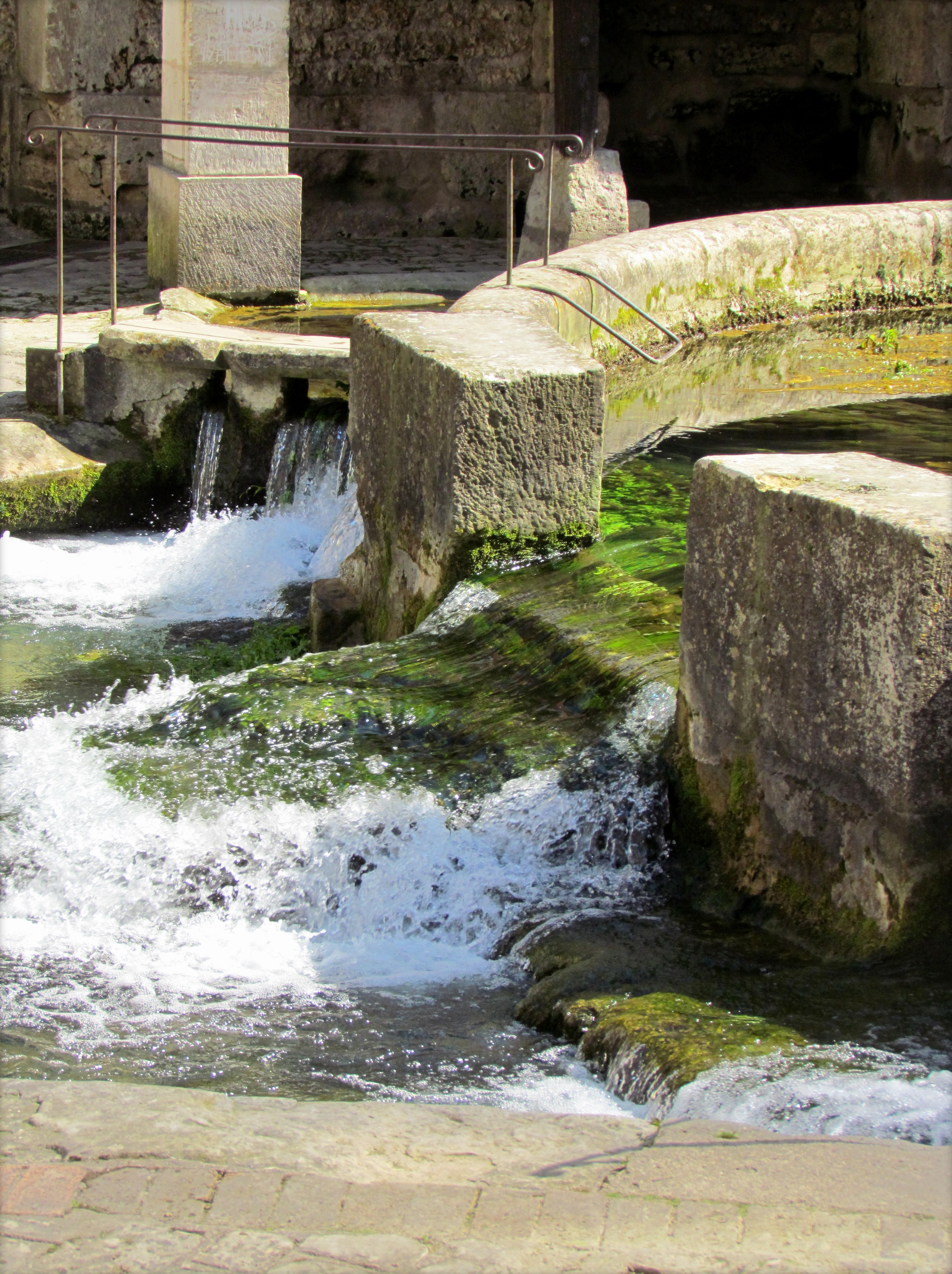
Flow of the Fosse Dionne

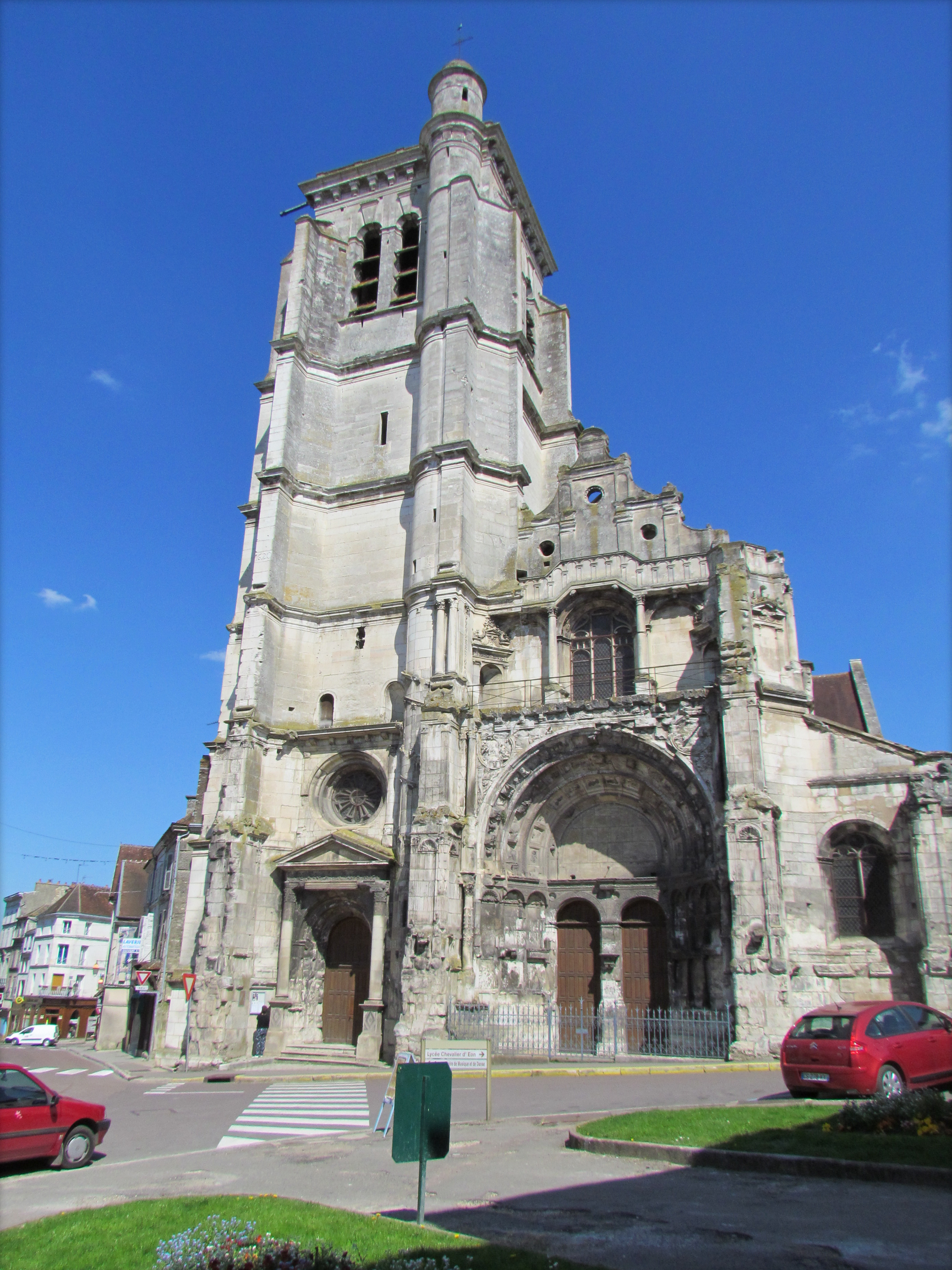
Église Notre-Dame

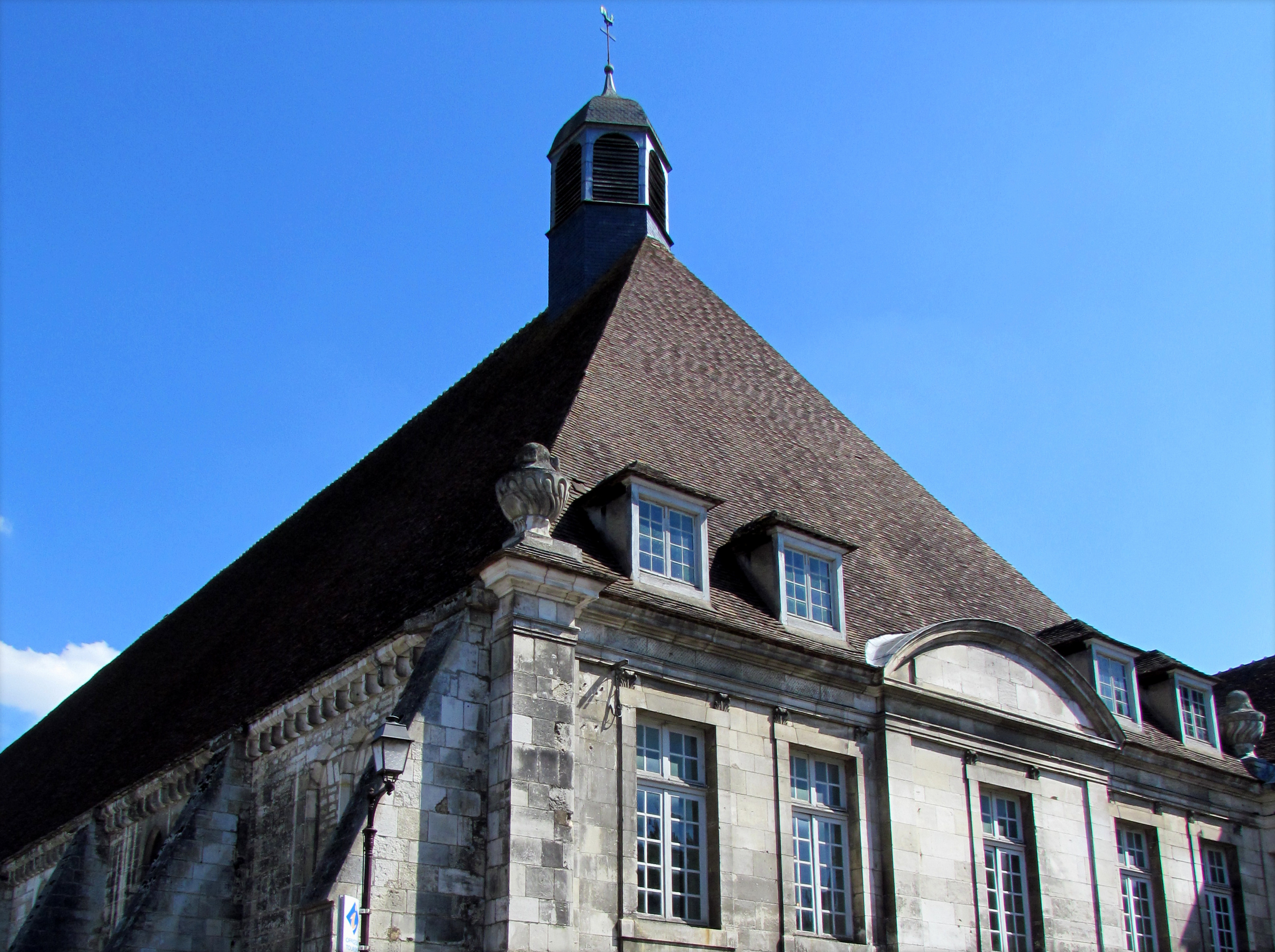
Hôtel-Dieu

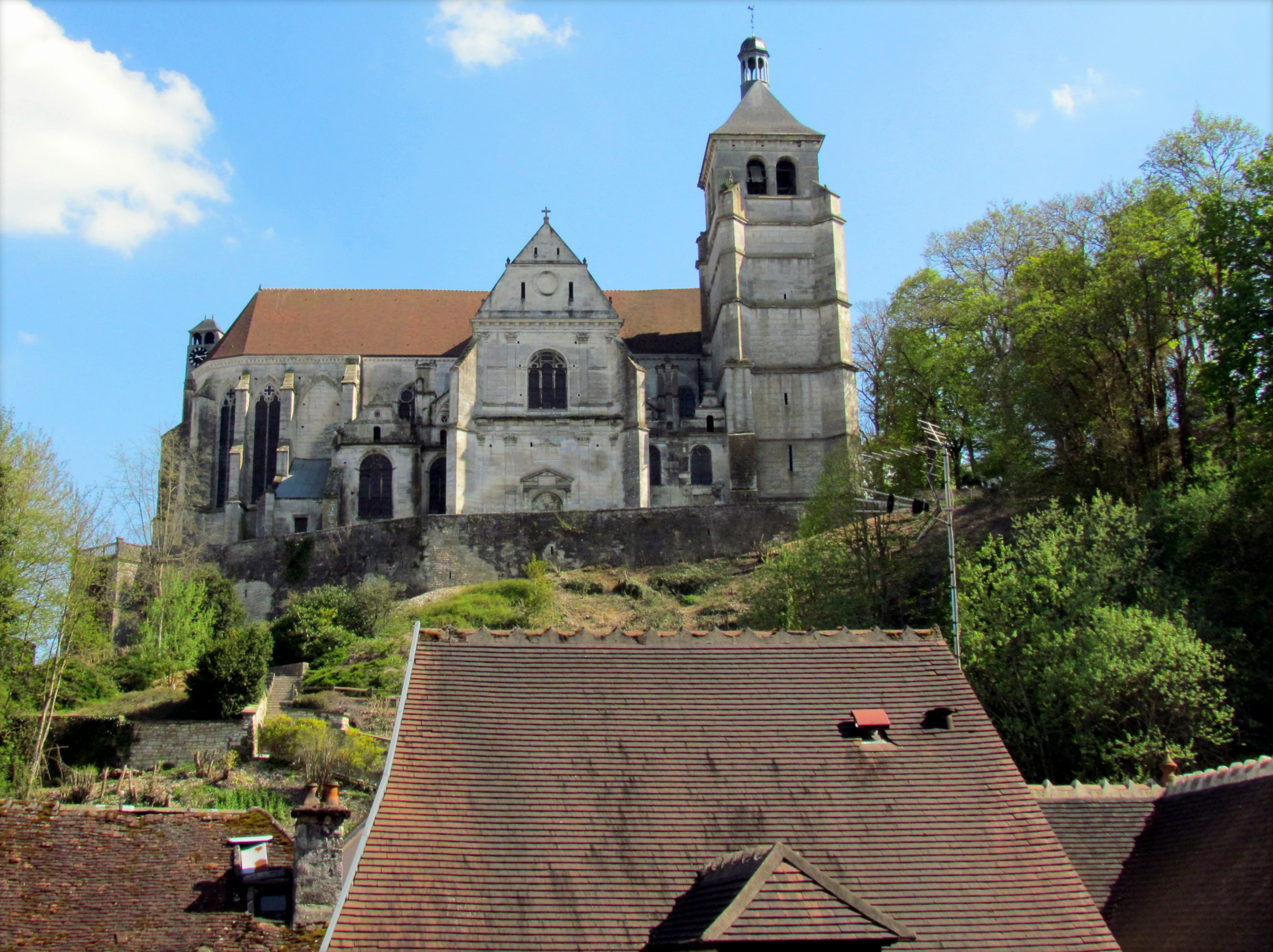
Église Saint-Pierre
(view 1)

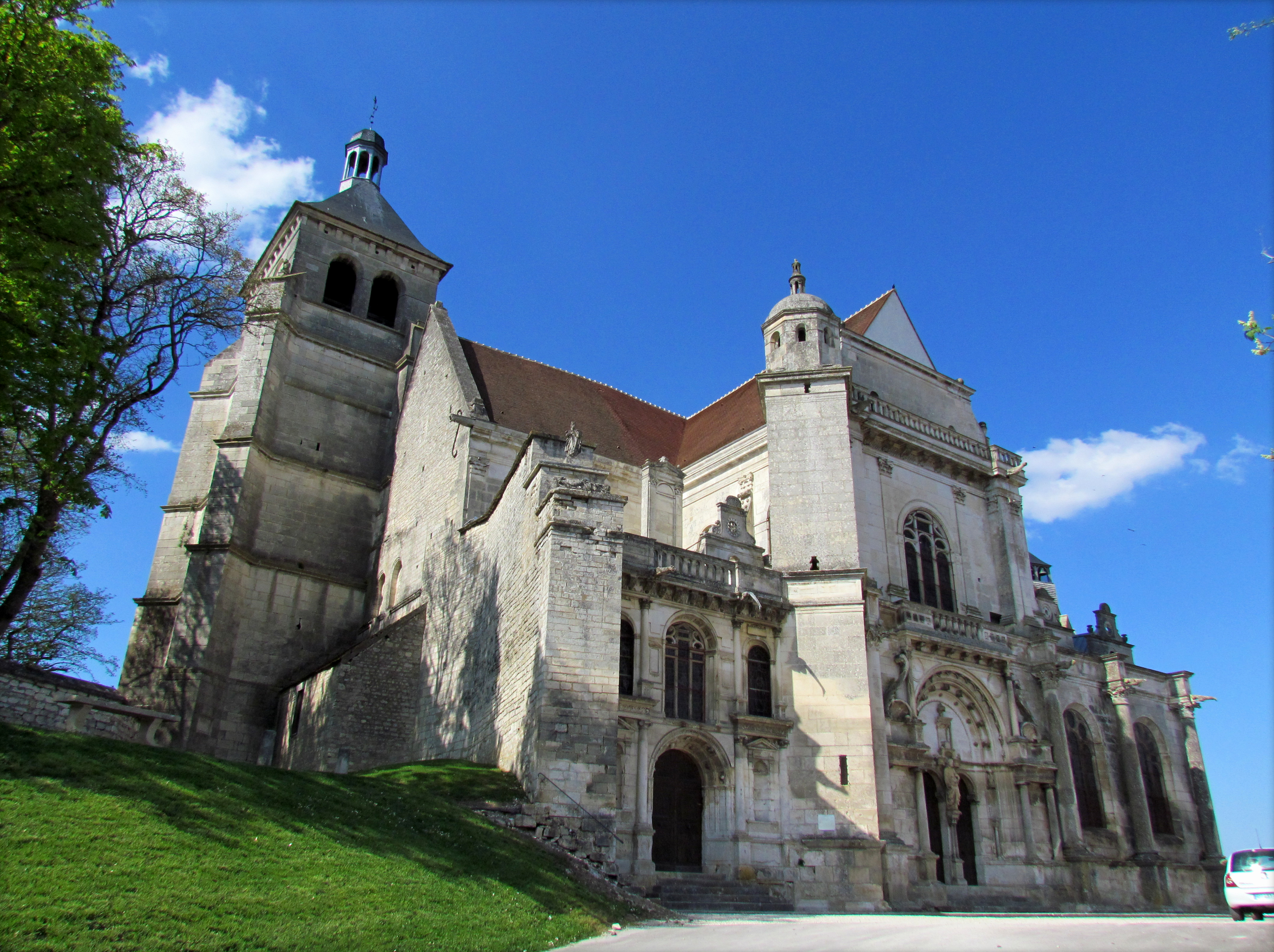
Église Saint-Pierre
(view 2)

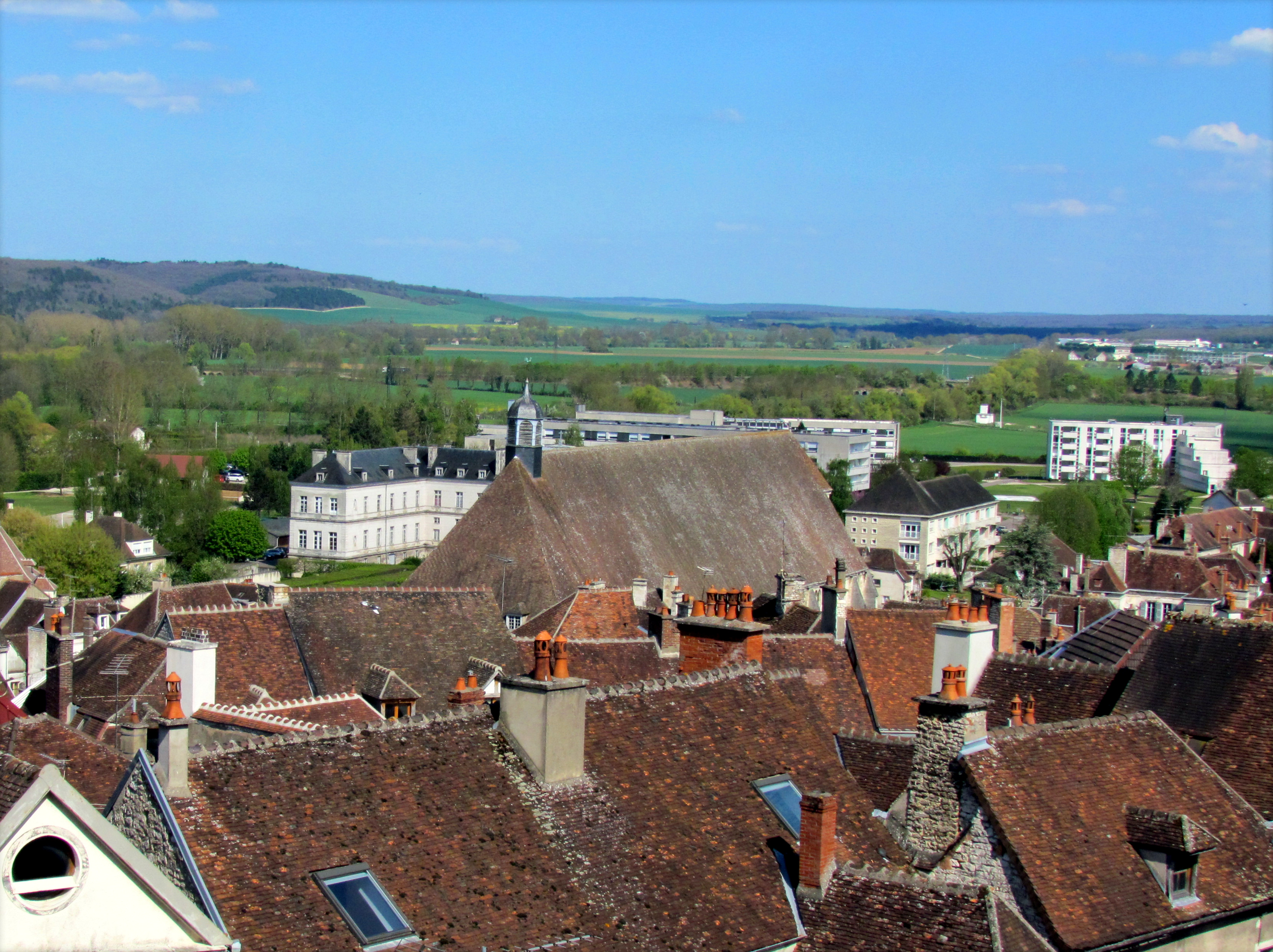
View of the imposing roof of the Hôtel-Dieu

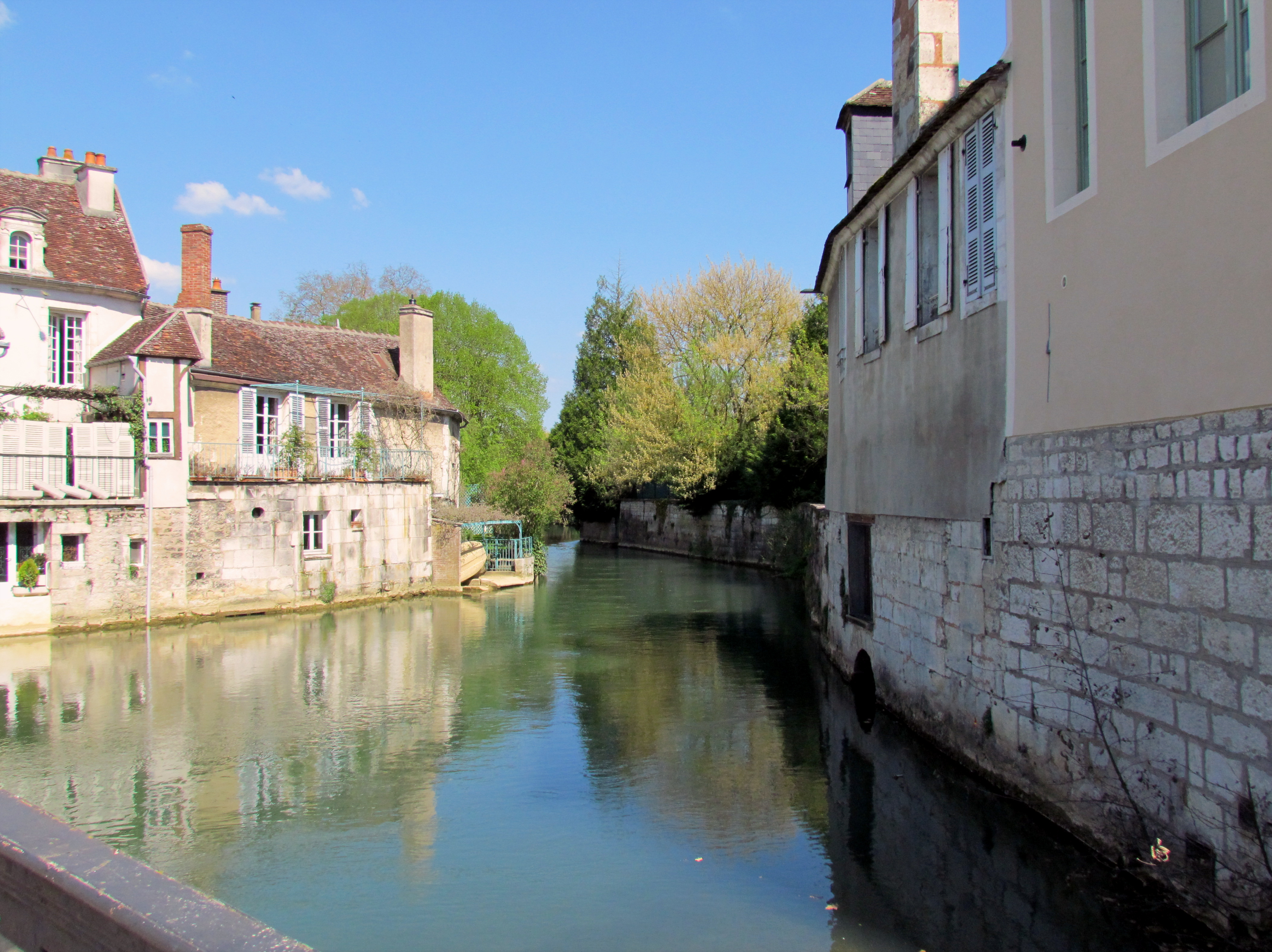
View of the Armançon

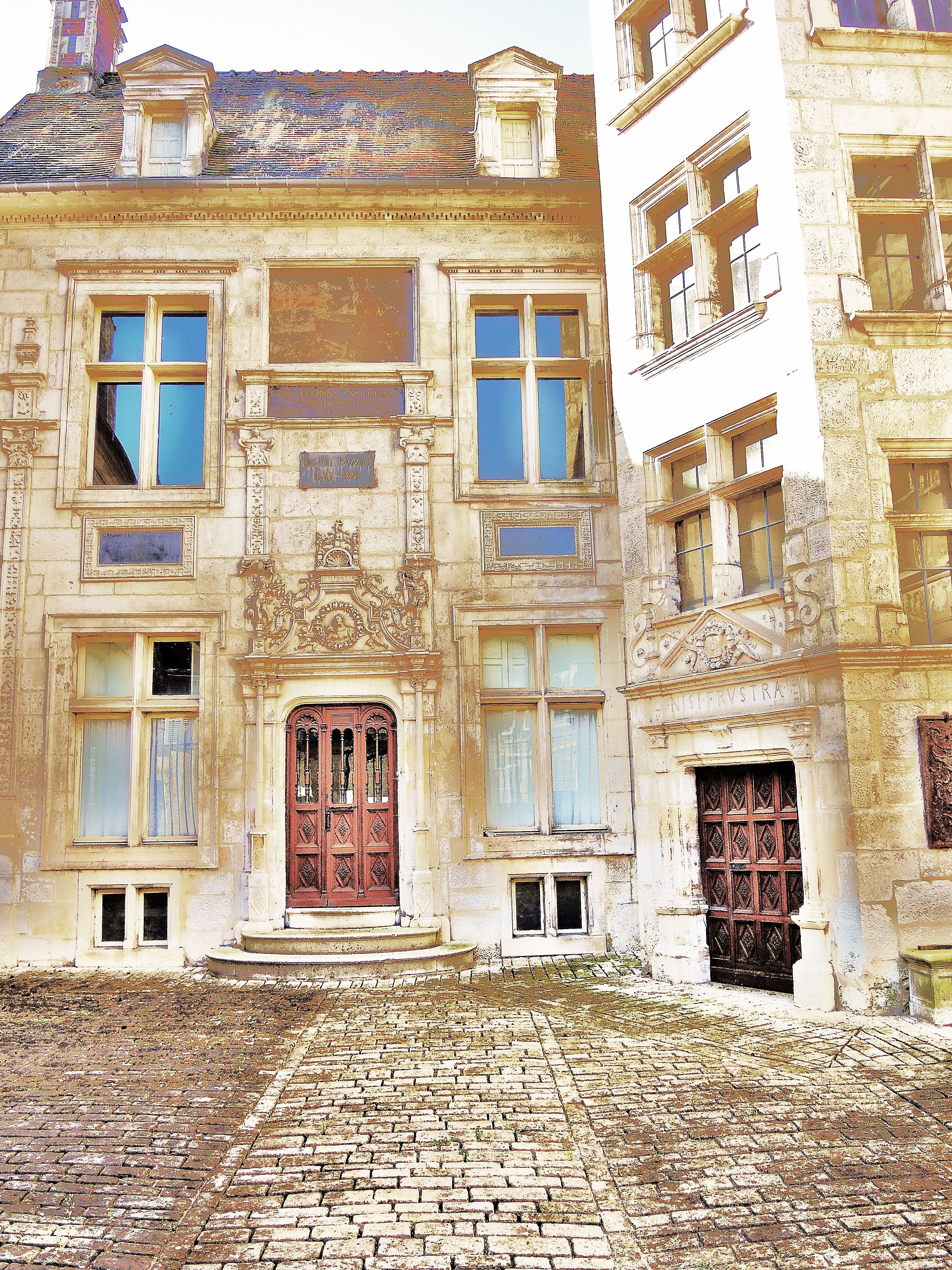
Hôtel d'Uzès

== Notable personalities ==
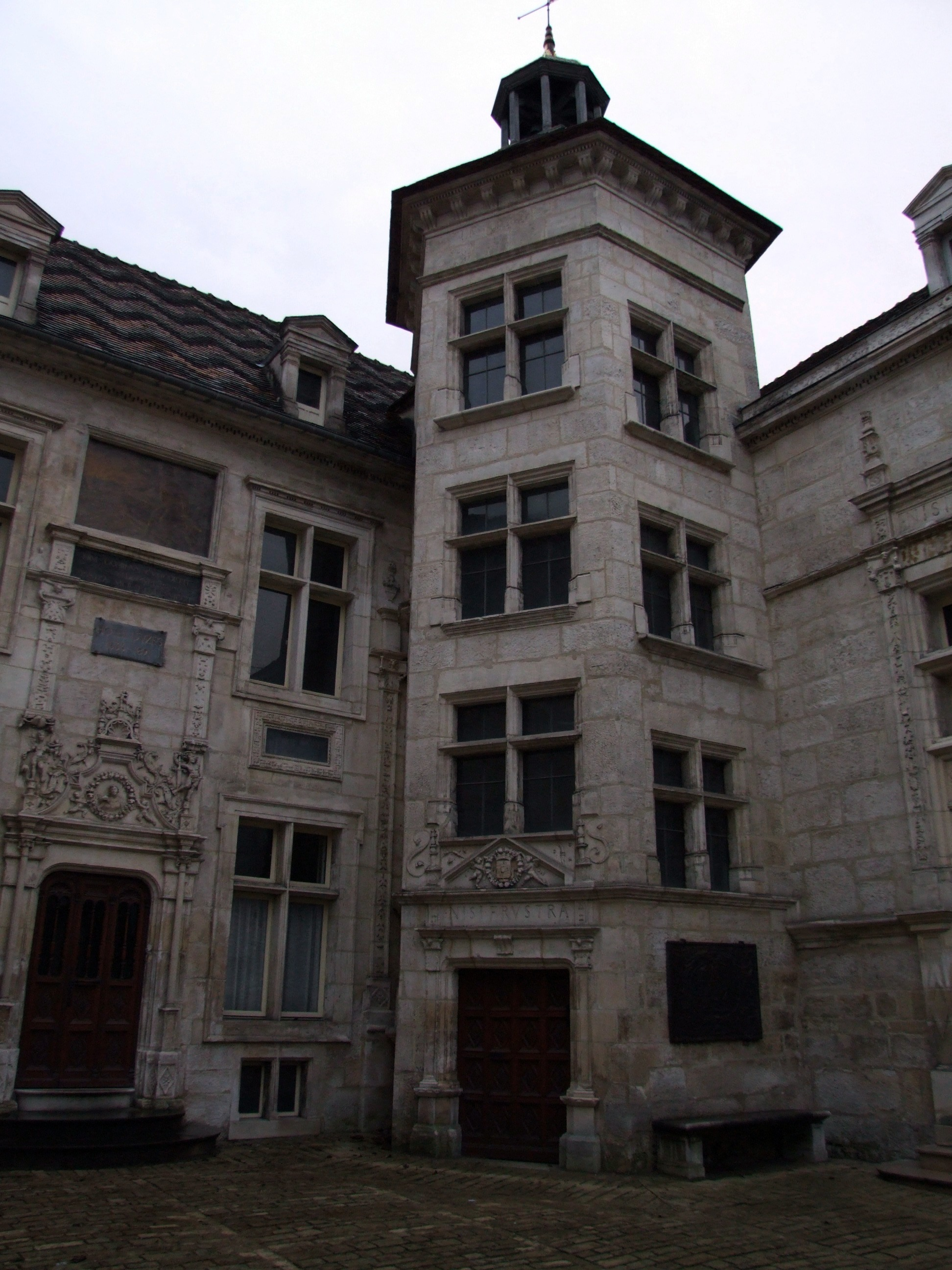
Tonnerre – Hotel d'Uzes

- Jupiter (Antiquity), king of the gods in the Roman pantheon. In ancient times, he was credited with creating the city of Tornodurum when he fell into the lost valley of Pagus Tornodorensis. Becoming Tonnerre in the Middle Ages, it is said that the exact location of the impact is symbolized by the Fosse Dionne whose waters were called "divona" (divine in Latin).
- Ebbon of Sens (?-743), abbot of Saint-Pierre-le-vif and the bishop of Sens, born in Tonnerre.
- Thierry II of Orleans (?-1022), former bishop of Orleans, died in Tonnerre.
- Margaret of Burgundy-Tonnerre (1248–1308), retired in Tonnerre, founder of the Hôtel-Dieu.
- Louise of Clermont (1504–1596), Countess of Tonnerre, Duchess of Uzès.
- François Michel Le Tellier, Marquis of Louvois (1641–1691), Secretary of War during the reign of Louis XIV, Count of Tonnerre from 1684.
- Charles de Beaumont, Chevalier d'Éon (1728–1810), born in Tonnerre at Hôtel d'Uzès.
- Jean-Baptiste Chaussard (1729–1818), royal architect, born in Tonnerre.
- Agnès Fayolle de la Marcelle (1746–1832), politician, born in Tonnerre.
- Jean Gaspard de Vence (1747–1808), corsair and admiral, died in his property of Vaulichères.
- François Barbuat de Maison-Rouge (1767–1799), born in Tonnerre.
- Louis Anne Marie Gouré de Villemontée (1768–1813), brigadier general.
- Jean-Baptiste-Marie Campenon (1819–1891), general, Minister of War, born in Tonnerre.
- Charles Joseph Dumas-Vence (1823–1904), admiral, born in Tonnerre.
- Ernest Cœurderoy (1825–1862), anarchist, born in Avallon. His wife sold his house to Tonnerre.
- Armand Colin (1842–1900), publisher, born in Tonnerre.
- Marie Huot (1846–1930), author and feminist, born in Tonnerre.
- Frédéric Damé (1849–1907), journalist, historian and philologist, born in Tonnerre.
- Henri Chaput (1857–1919), surgeon, born in Tonnerre.
- Émile Bernard (1868–1941), painter, founder of the School of Pont-Aven, lived there from 1904 to 1919.
- Georges Henri Carré (1878–1945), painter.
- Edmond Archdeacon (1863–1906), councilor general.
- Ernest Archdeacon (1898–1950), France's foremost promoter of aviation. He was also an avid sporting motorist. He was the proprietor of the Abby of Saint Michael (French: abbaye Saint-Michel).
- André Maire (1898–1984), painter.
- Jean-Pierre Sioul (1902–1991), artist.
- Élie Wermelinger (1906–1993), journalist for L'Équipe, followed the itinerary of the Tour de France.

== Events ==
- Medieval People of Tonnerre (French: médiévales de Tonnerre) occurs every even September.
- Tonnerre Area Wines (French: vinées tonnerroises): exhibition, tasting and sale of wines from the commune and its environs and of gastronomic products on Easter weekend in the great room of the former hospital of Margaret of Burgundy. The festival includes the enthronement of new Knights of the Wine-tasting by the Tonnerre Area Brotherhood of Lightning (French: confrérie des Foudres du Tonnerrois) and the Brotherhood of the Cassis (French: confrérie du Cassis).
- The literary festival Written and Spoken (French: écrits et dits): in May, there are themed events related to literature (e.g. lectures, theater, tales, readings).
- The Academy and Music Festival of Tonnerre: the first week of July.
- The fair is held in the town center on the Pâtis in front of the train station and occurs on the last Saturday in August, lasting from Friday through Monday. It attracts about 100 exhibitors to the fairground.
- Regional Auto Race: on Mount Sara, on the edge of the Domain de la Chappe on Departmental Route 117. It takes place on the 3rd Sunday in August. Organized by Team Vauban, under the aegis of ASA (Automobiles Sportives Aquitaine) Yonne for the French Cup of the Fédération Française du Sport Automobile and the Bourgogne Franche-Comté Challenges.
- The Exhibition of Antique Dealers and Artisans of Tonnerre (French: Le salon des antiquaires et des métiers d'art de Tonnerre): exhibition of furniture and antiques and presentation of the works of artisans in the hospices of Tonnerre, last weekend in September.

== Tonnerre in the arts ==
=== Paintings ===
Tonnerre served as the setting for several paintings by painter Émile Bernard, including La Famille à Tonnerre between 1908 and 1910, Tonnerre les deux églises in 1904, Paysage près de Tonnerre (1905) and Chemin de l'église Saint-Pierre à Tonnerre (1905, oil on canvas).

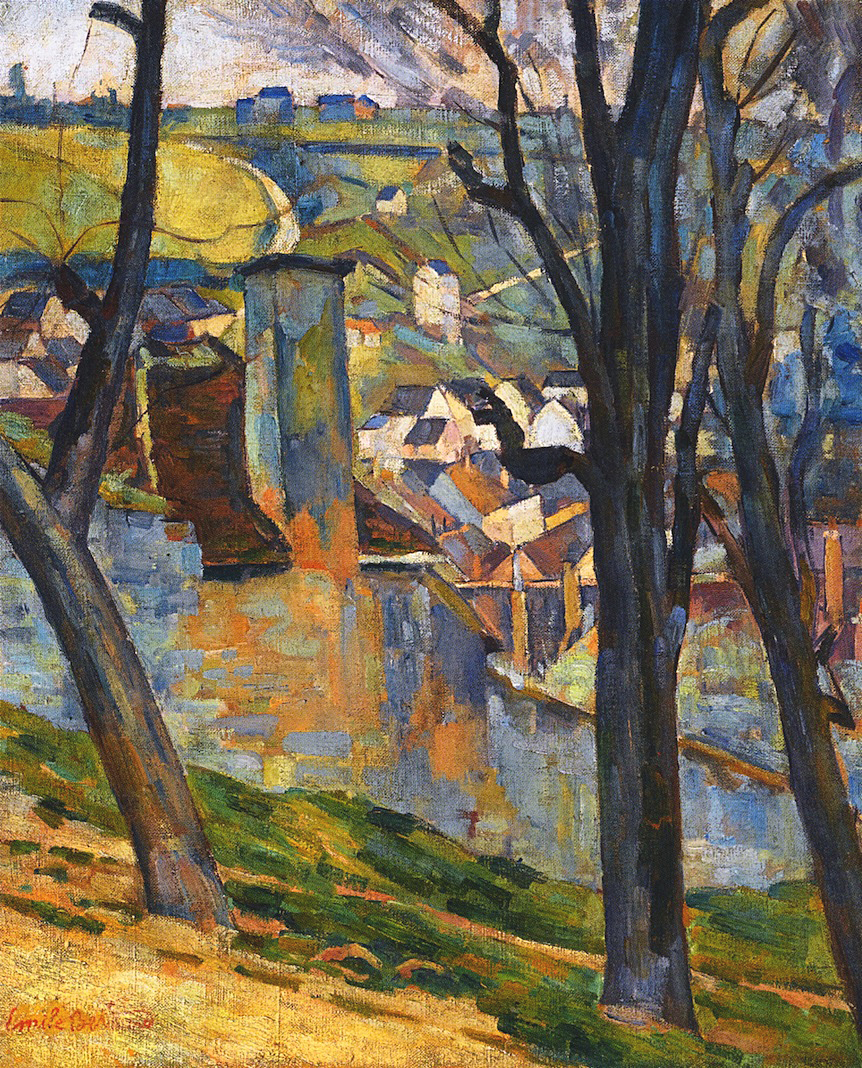
Émile Bernard : Paysage près de Tonnerre (1905).

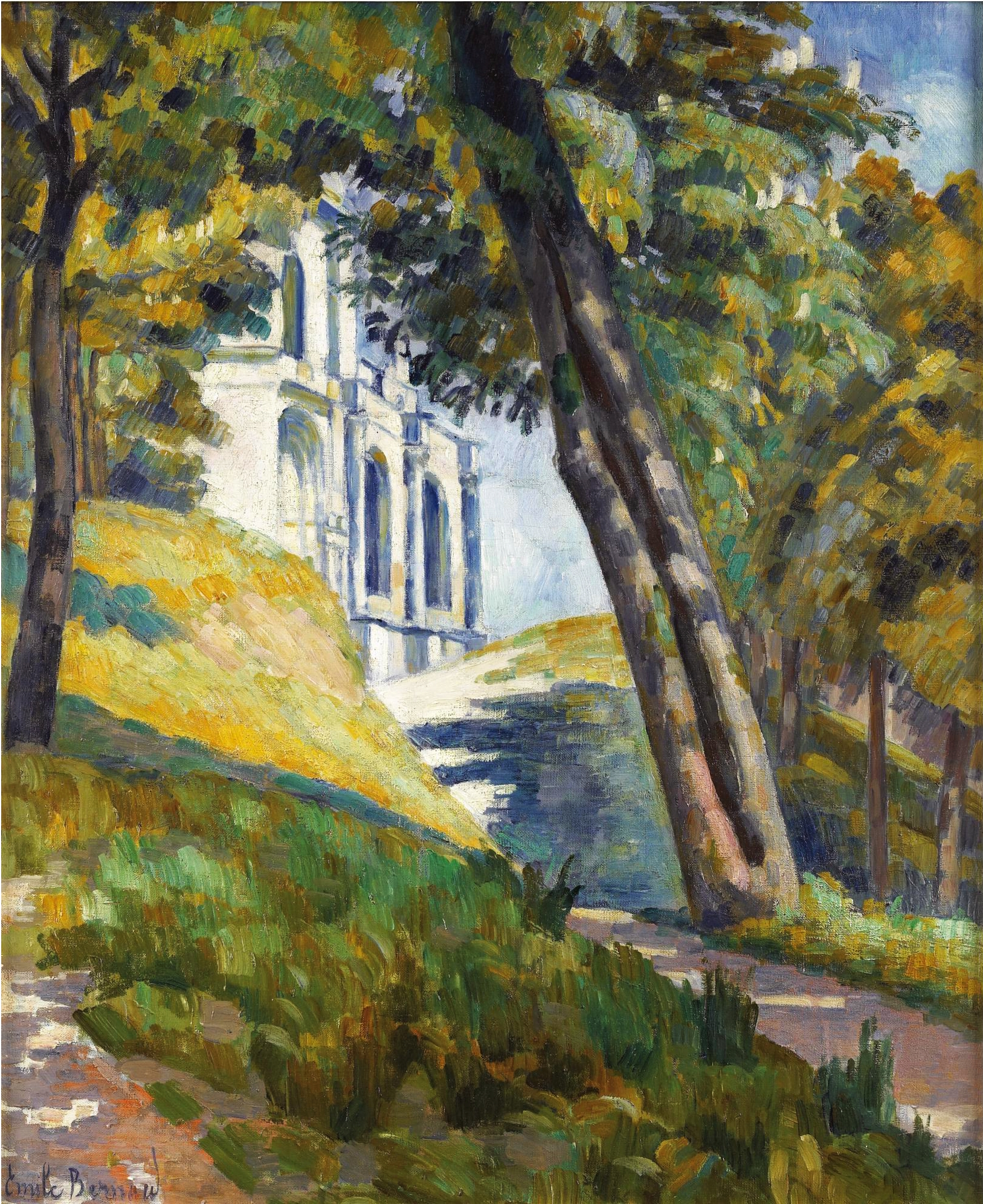
Émile Bernard : Chemin de l'église Saint-Pierre à Tonnerre (1905, oil on canvas).
Click images to enlarge.

=== Movies ===
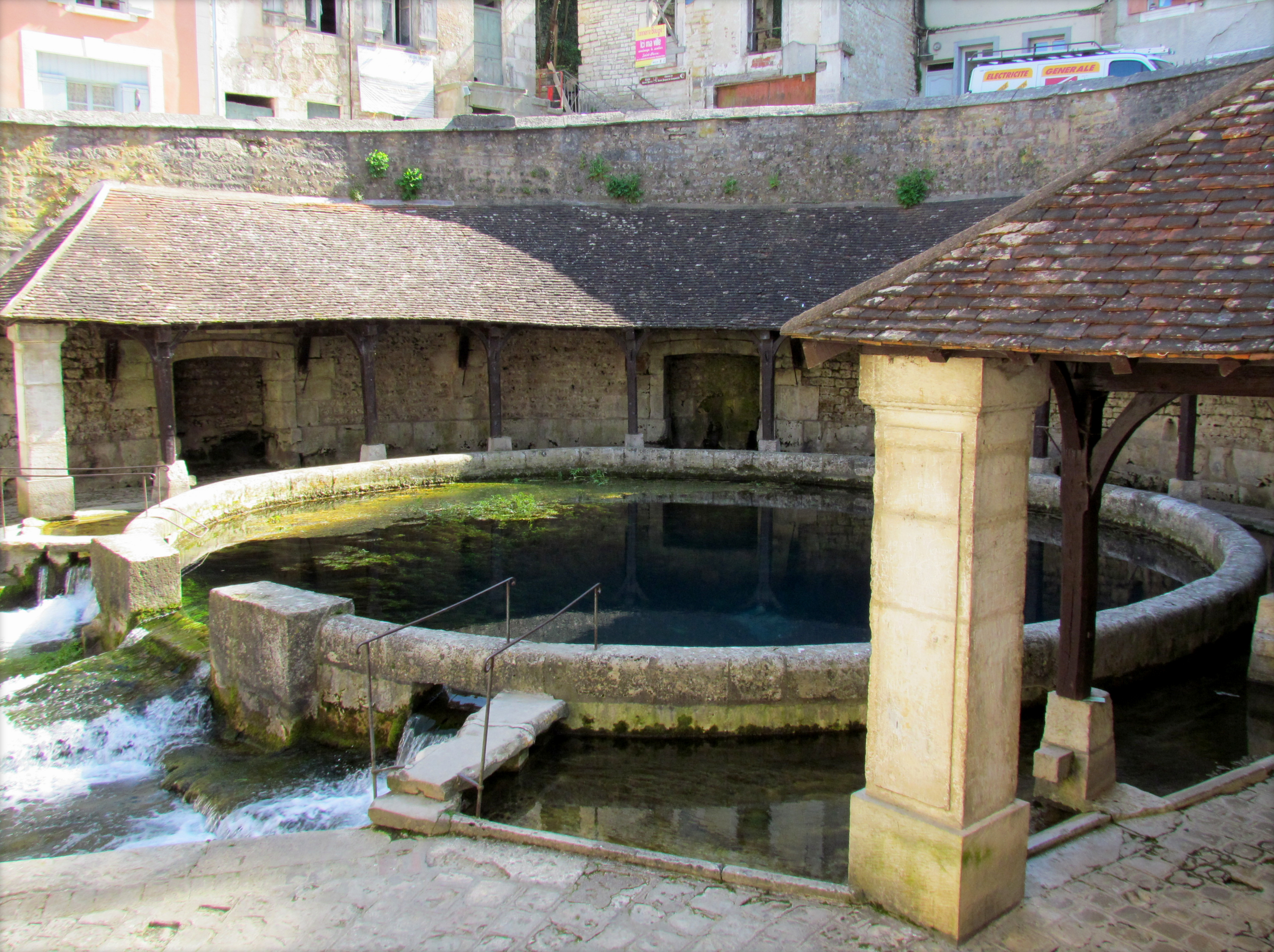
The Fosse Dionne

Filmmaker Guillaume Brac shot his homonymic film Tonnerre in 2013, starring Vincent Macaigne, Solène Rigot and Bernard Menez. Among the various places filmed in the commune, many of the scenes were shot at the Fosse Dionne.

== Twin towns ==
- (Republic of Ireland) Nenagh, County Tipperary, Ireland
- Dobříš, Czech Republic
- Montabaur, Germany

== See also ==
- Communes of the Yonne department
