= Octave de Gaulle =

French industrial designer

Octave de Gaulle is a French industrial designer.

== Biography ==
Son of Grégoire de Gaulle and Constance Vernier, Octave is also the great-grandnephew of General de Gaulle, the husband of Alice Vial, and the son-in-law of Nicolas Vial.

He exhibited at the Museum of Decorative Arts and Design in 2015, as well as at the Cité du design in Saint-Étienne in 2021.

From 2015 to 2019, he worked with Pernod Ricard on the design of a bottle for drinking Mumm champagne in zero gravity, in the manner of Captain Haddock in the Tintin book Explorers on the Moon.
