= Octave Boudouard =

French chemist

Octave Leopold Boudouard
- Born: 1872
- Died: 1923 (aged 50–51)
- Occupation: Chemist
- Known for: Boudouard reaction

Octave Leopold Boudouard (1872–1923) was a French chemist known for his 1905 discovery of the Boudouard reaction.

== Career ==
Octave Leopold Boudouard became a professor at the Conservatoire National des Arts et Métiers in Paris. He worked in various fields of applied chemistry, such as the chemistry of fuels and clays. His most important work was his research into chemical equilibria when reducing iron oxides in a blast furnace. In 1901 he proposed the first theory of the hydrogenation of carbon monoxide, where he considered that metal oxide was reacting with carbon. In 1905 Boudouard identified the Boudouard reaction, where carbon and carbon dioxide combine to form carbon monoxide at high temperatures, while the reverse occurs at lower temperatures. In 1912 he published a paper on the odors of Paris, researching the chemicals polluting the air of that city.

== Boudouard reaction ==
The Boudouard reaction is:

2CO ⇌ CO_{2} + C

Boudouard found that when an excess of coke reacts with air or metal oxides, below about 400 °C this produces carbon dioxide and soot, while at temperatures above 1,000 °C it produces carbon monoxide. Between these extremes a mixture of the carbon monoxide, carbon dioxide and soot is produced Understanding the reaction is a significant factor in the design of blast furnaces where the goal is to maximize use of fuel while minimizing production of soot.

== Bibliography ==
- Le Chatelier, H.; Boudouard, O. (1898). "Limits of Flammability of Gaseous Mixtures". Bulletin de la Société Chimique de France. 19. Paris: 483–488.
- Le Chatelier, H.; Boudouard, O. (1900). Mesure des températures élevées. Paris: G. Carré et C. Naud.
- Chatelier, Henri Le; Boudouard, Octave; Burgess, George Kimball (1912). High-temperature measurements. Wiley.
- Boudouard, O. (1922). Paul Schutzenberger et l'isotopie.
