= Hôtel d'Uzès (Tonnerre) =

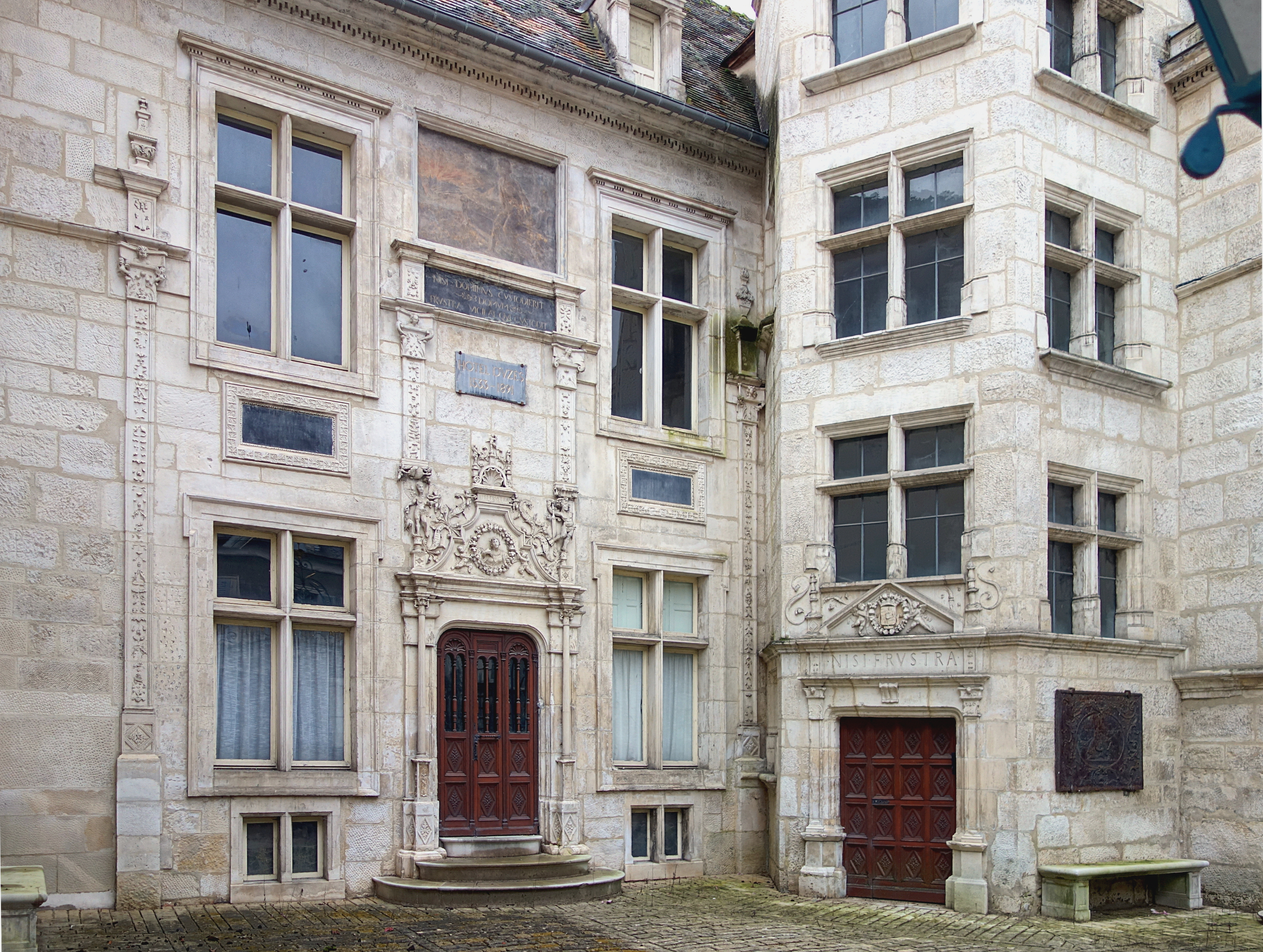
- Hôtel d'Uzès, December 2013
- Interactive map of the Hôtel d'Uzès area

General information
- Type: Hôtel particulier
- Location: Tonnerre, Yonne, France
- Coordinates: 47°51′20″N 3°58′29″E
- Client: Jean Canelle

Design and construction
- Designations: Monument historique

The Hôtel d'Uzès is a 16th century hôtel particulier located in Tonnerre, in the Yonne department of France.

== History ==
The hôtel was likely built by a wealthy bourgeois, Jean Canelle (1503–1562), later Lord of Vaulichères, Receiver of Aids and Taxes in Tonnerre, after 1556. The date of 1533 was engraved during the restoration of 1888. His descendants occupied it until 1651.

This house owes its name to Louise de Clermont-Tallard, Countess of Tonnerre, who married, for the second time, to Antoine de Crussol, 1st Duke of Uzès (1528–1573). Her first husband was François du Bellay. The Countess of Tonnerre, a friend of the Canelles, stayed here on many occasions. Charles de Beaumont, Chevalier d'Éon, was born at the hôtel on 5 October 1728.

The building was purchased by the Caisse d'épargne, a savings bank, in 1879. Heavily restored in 1888, the controversial work featured decorations and frescos by the painter Georges Henri Carré, completed in 1907. The building has been listed as a monument historique since 18 May 1926.

=== Architecture ===
The courtyard and the façade are all that remain of a much larger complex. The decoration of the building makes it an example of Renaissance constructions in Paris: corner turret, skylights, mullioned windows, niches, shells, friezes decorated with extreme delicacy, arabesques, fauns, etc.

The two side statues, on the other hand, date from the restoration of 1888.

== Gallery ==
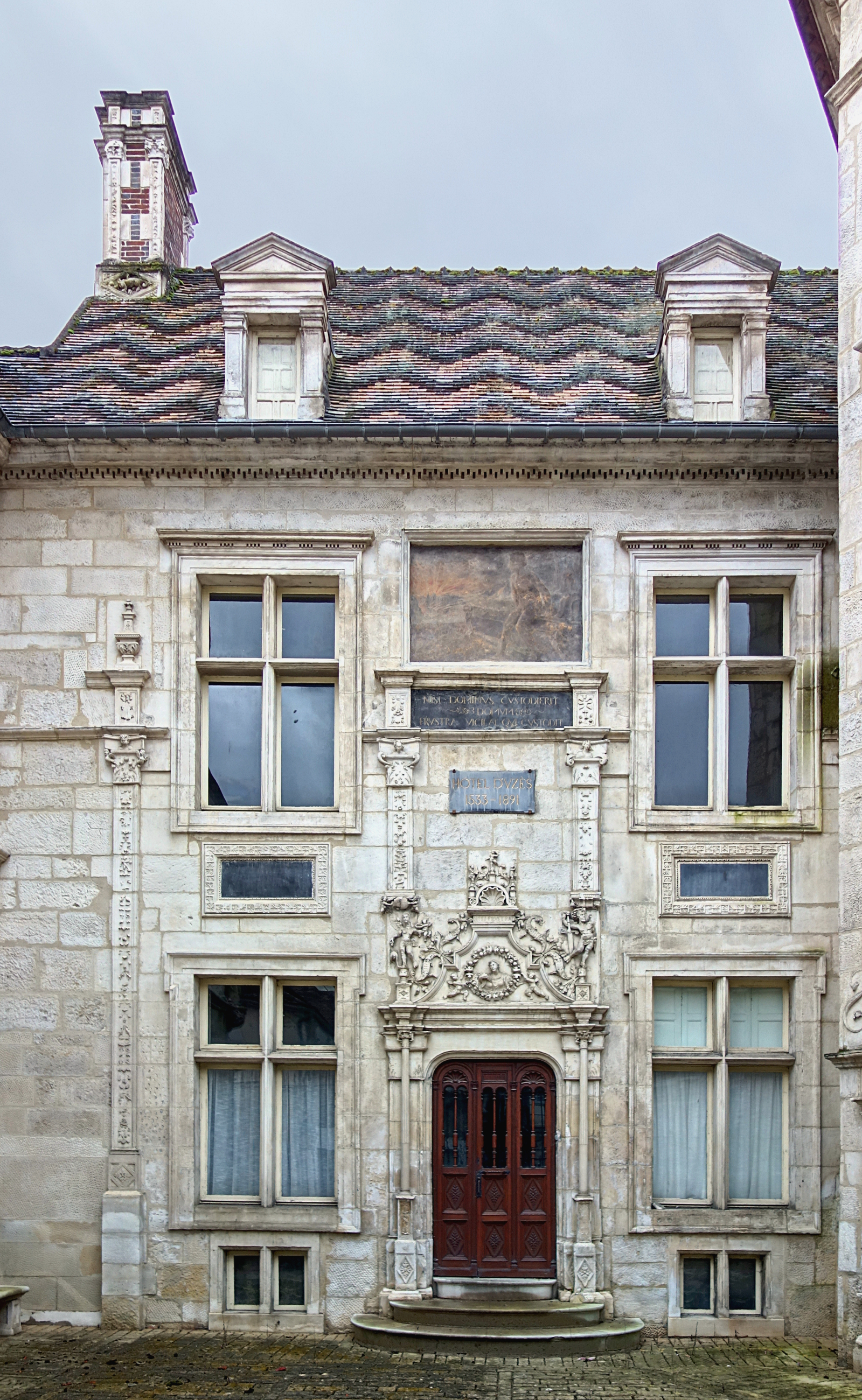
December 2013

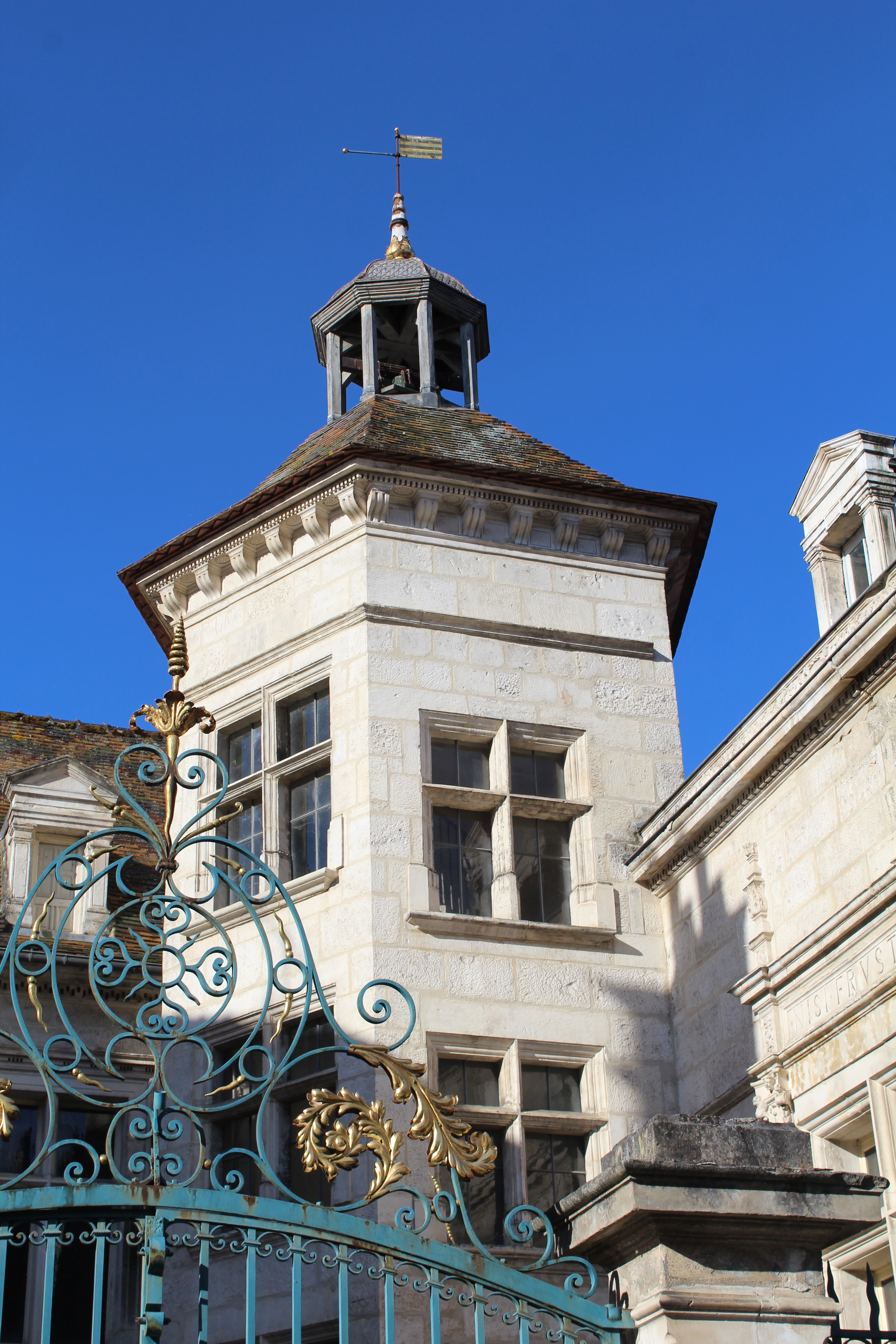
May 2017

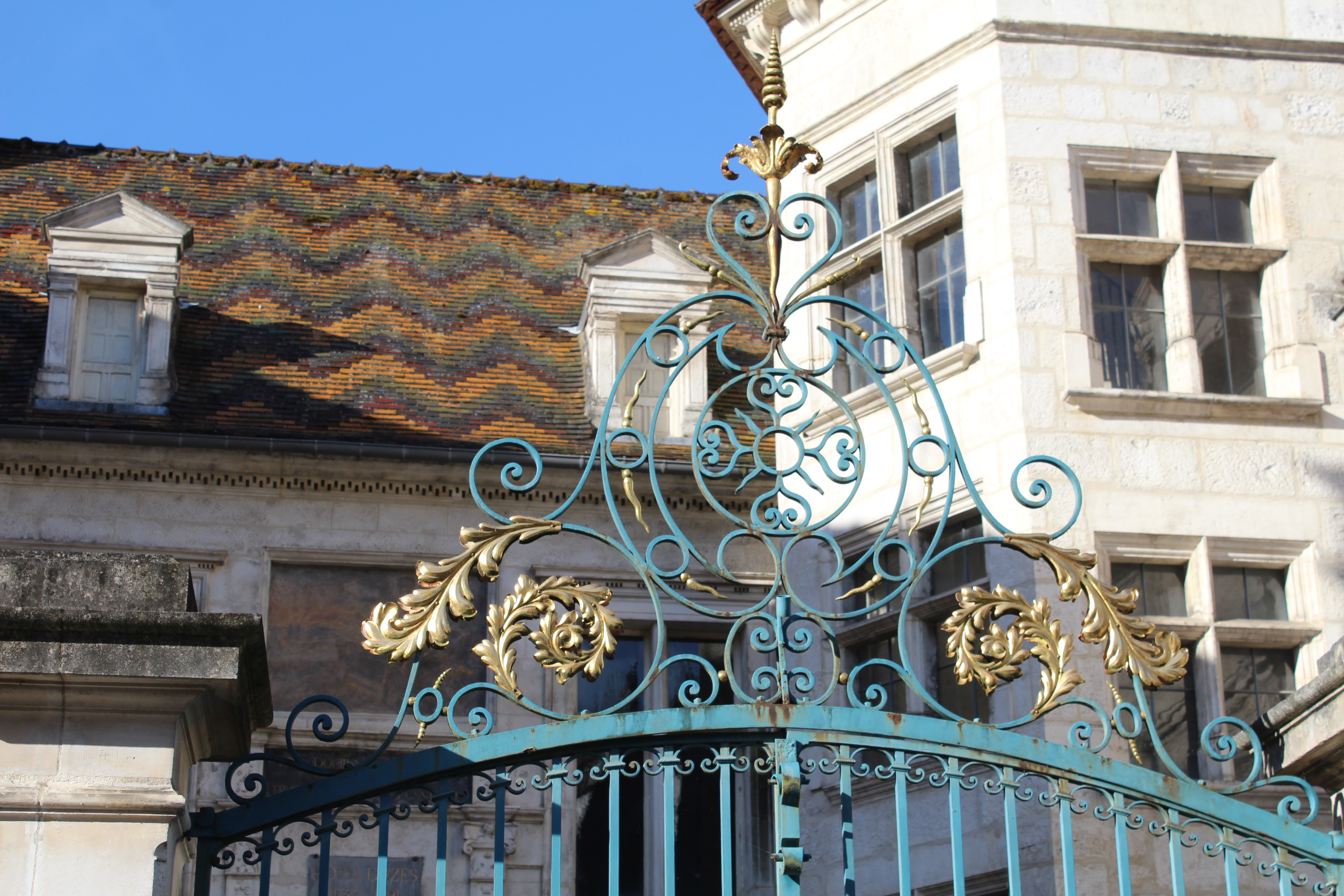
May 2017

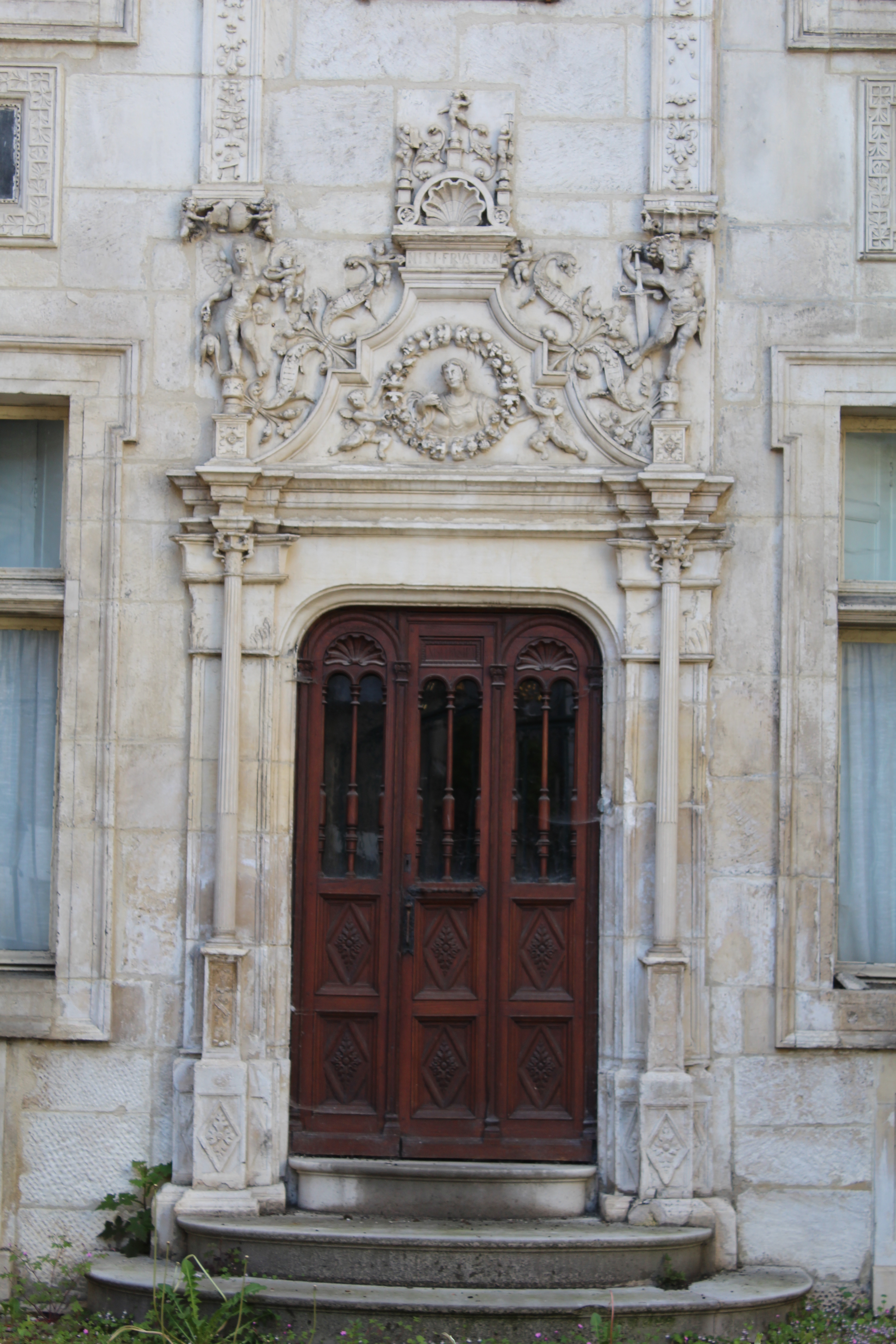
May 2017

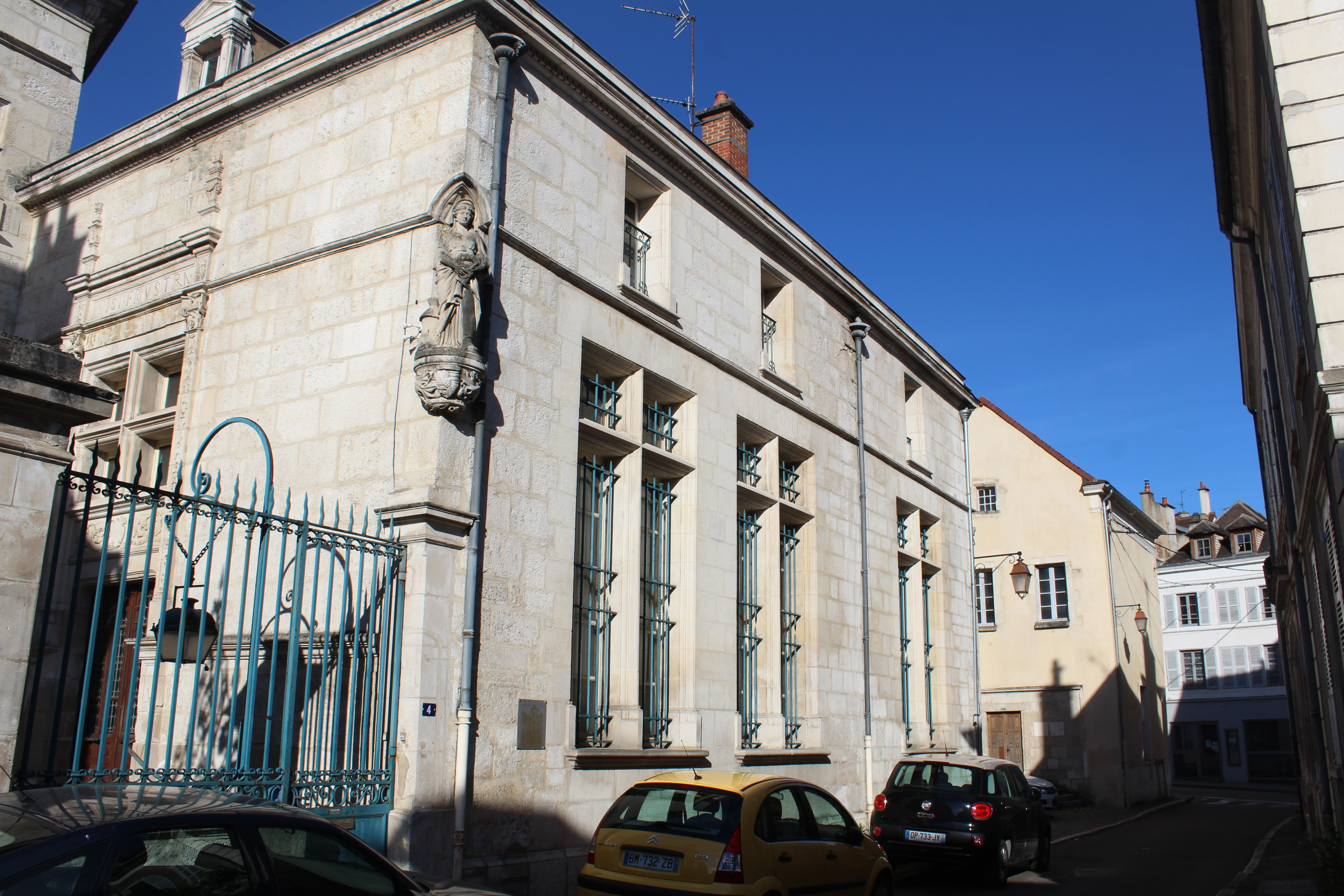
May 2017
