= Henri Chaput =

French surgeon

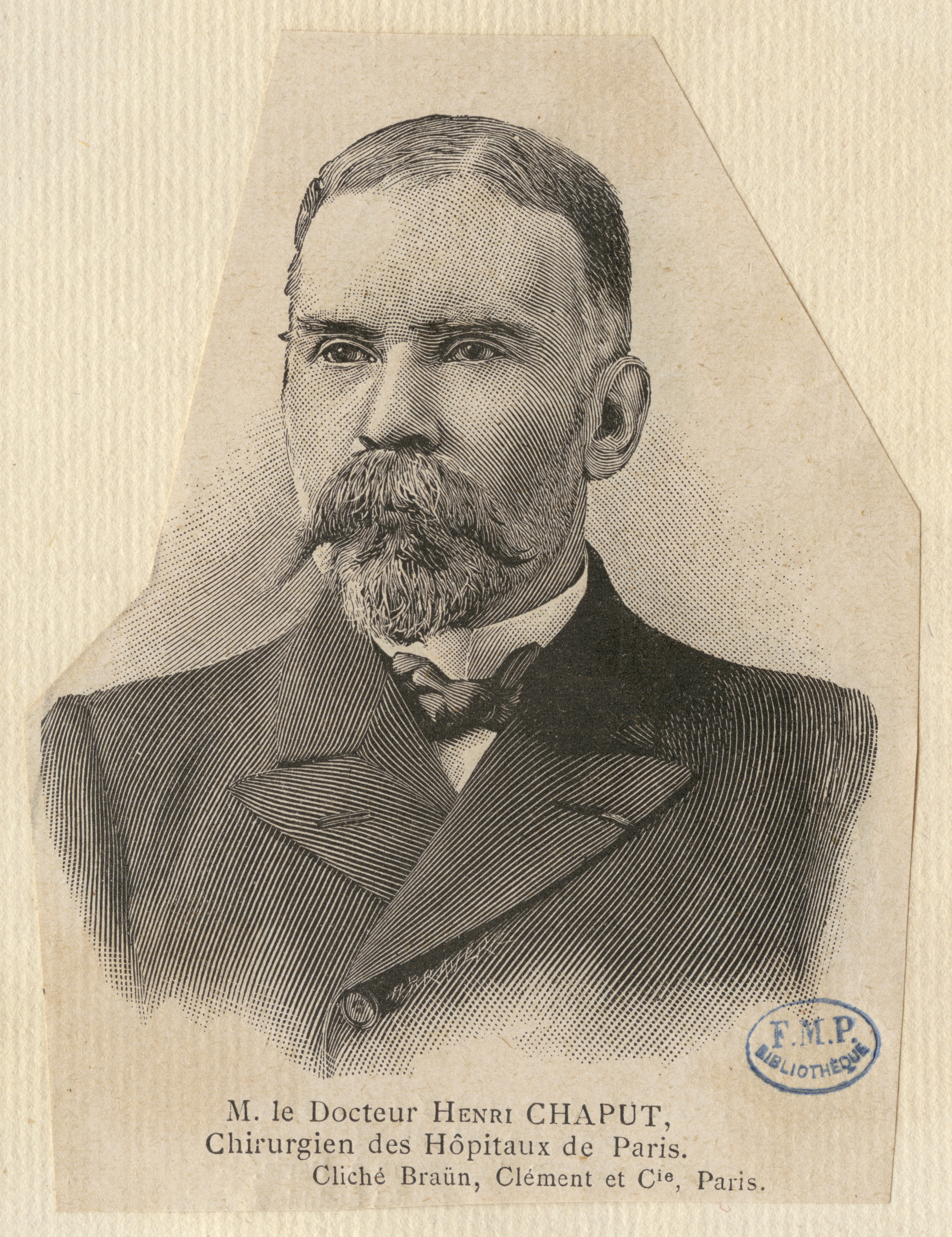
Henri Chaput

Victor Alexandre Henri Chaput (17 November 1857, Tonnerre – 1919) was a French surgeon who specialized in intestinal surgery.

== Biography ==
He studied medicine in Paris, where he received his doctorate in 1885. In 1888 he became a hospital surgeon, subsequently performing surgery at the Hôpitaux Broussais, Boucicaut, and Lariboisièr during his career.

He was at the forefront of surgical asepsis, advocating the use of sterile rubber (caoutchouc) gloves during operations. He was known for his preference of lumbar anaesthetics (using stovaine) instead of general anaesthesia for most surgical operations.

== Medical terms ==
- Chaput's method: Surgical implantation of the ureter into the intestine.
- Tillaux-Chaput fracture: A fracture of the posterolateral tibial epiphysis. Prior to Chaput's description, Paul Jules Tillaux described a similar fracture involving the anteriolateral tibia (1892).

== Written works ==
In 1898 he published a collection of Octave Terrillon's works titled "Oeuvres" (2 volumes). Other written efforts by Chaput include:

- Étude expérimentale et clinique sur le mécanisme des fractures de la rotule, 1888 – Experimental and clinical study on fractures of the kneecap mechanism.
- Technique et indications des opérations sur l'intestin, l'estomac et les voies biliaires, 1893 – Techniques and indications of operations involving the intestine, stomach and bile ducts.
- De l'Abouchement des uretères dans l'intestin, 1894 – Anastomosis of the ureters into the intestine.
- Thérapeutique chirurgicale des affections de l'intestin, du rectum et péritoine, 1896 – Surgical therapy for disorders of the intestine, rectum and peritoneum.
- Asepsie et antisepsie chirurgicales, 1893 (with Octave Terrillon) – Surgical asepsis and antisepsis.
- Les fractures malléolaires du cou-de-pied et les accidents du travail, 1907 – Malleolar fractures of the instep and work-related accidents.
