= Octave Terrillon =

French physician and surgeon

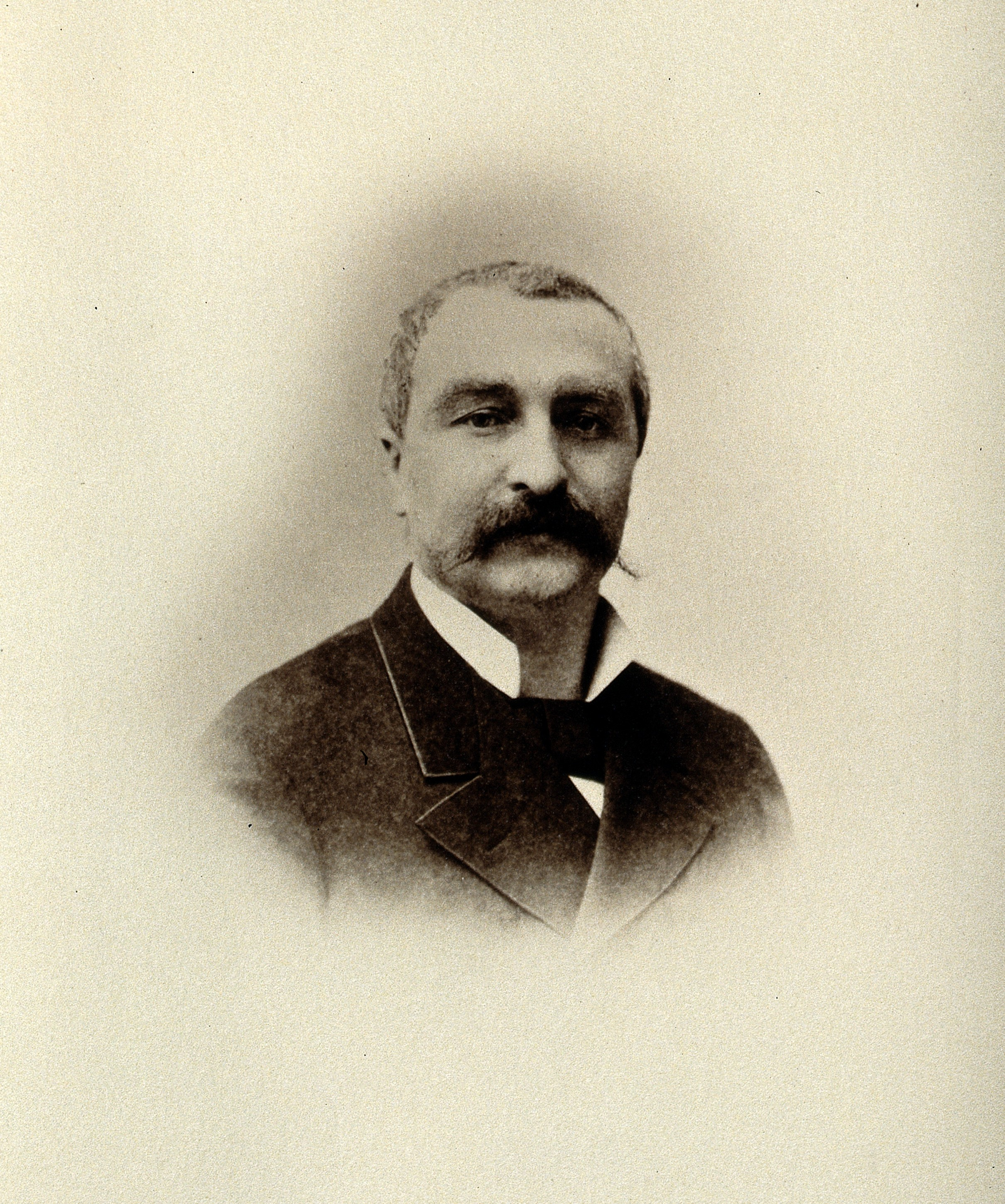
Octave Roch Simon Terrillon

Octave Roch Simon Terrillon (17 May 1844, Oigny-sur-Seine – 22 December 1895, Paris) was a French physician and surgeon, known as a pioneer of aseptic surgery.

From 1868 he worked as a hospital interne in Paris, where in 1873 he received his medical doctorate. In 1876 he qualified as a hospital surgeon, and eventually became associated with the Salpêtrière Hospital. In 1878 he became an associate professor at the faculty of medicine in Paris.

On April 13, 1957, a French postage stamp featuring a portrait of Dr. Terrillon was issued. Included on the stamp were images of a microscope, an autoclave and some surgical instruments. Somewhere around 1882 he advocated the procedure of using boiling water, a heat sterilisation technique for disinfecting surgical instruments.

== Selected works ==
- Leçons de clinique chirurgicale professées à la Salpêtrière, 1889 – Lessons taught in the surgical clinic at the Salpêtrière.
- Traité des maladies du testicule et de ses annexes (with Charles Monod), 1889 – Treatise on testicular diseases.
- Asepsie et antisepsie chirurgicales (with Henri Chaput), 1894 – Surgical asepsis and antisepsis.
- Salpingites et ovarites, 1891 – Salpingitis and ovaritis.
