= Chevalier Saint-George =

The name Chevalier Saint-George can refer to

- Chevalier de Saint-Georges, the first European composer of African descent.
- James Francis Edward Stuart, "the pretender"
