= Bailleux =

Bailleux is a surname. Notable people with this surname include:

- Antoine Bailleux (fl. 18th century), French violinist and music publisher
- François Bailleux (1817–1866), Belgian lawyer
- Odile Bailleux (1939–2024), French harpsichordist and organist
- Roger Bailleux (1913–1988), French cyclist
