= Chevalier de Saint-Georges =

French musician (1745–1799)

Joseph Bologne, Chevalier de Saint-Georges
- Josèf Bolòng, Chèvalyé di Sen-Jòj
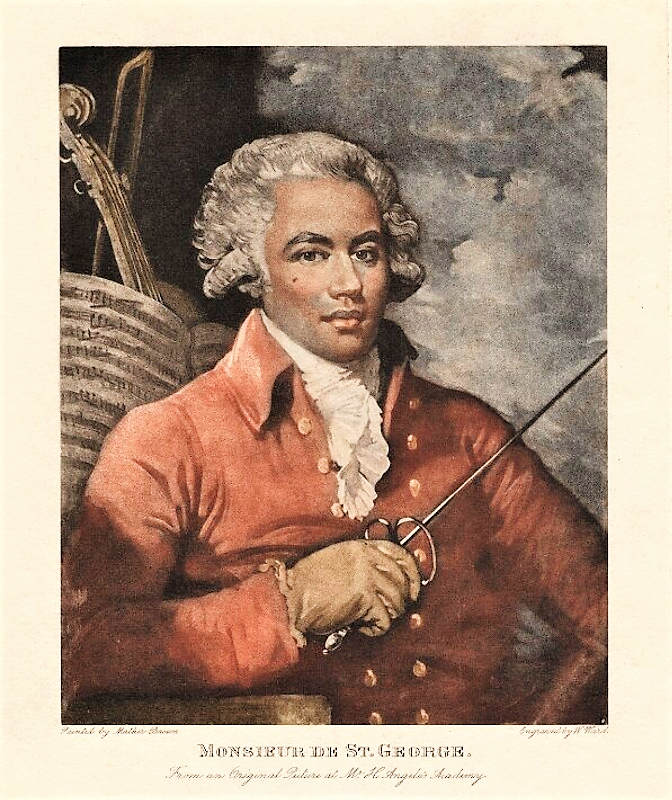
- Portrait of Saint-Georges (1788)
- Born: 25 December 1745; Baillif, Basse-Terre, Guadeloupe, French West Indies
- Died: 9 June 1799 (aged 53); Paris, French First Republic
- Education: Académie d'équitation
- Children: 1

Joseph Bologne, Chevalier de Saint-George(s) (/bəˈloʊn/; French: [ʒozɛf bɔlɔɲ]; 25 December 1745 – 9 June 1799) was a French violinist, conductor, composer, and soldier of African descent. Moreover, he demonstrated excellence as a fencer, an athlete, and a dancer. His historical significance lies partly in his distinctive background as a biracial free man of colour. (Note: Since 1685, a Code Noir had been the law in France and its colonial possessions. Any slave who set foot on the French soil was automatically freed by law.) Bologne was the first classical composer of African descent to attain widespread acclaim in Western music. He composed an array of violin concertos, string quartets, sinfonia concertantes, violin duets, sonatas, two symphonies, and an assortment of stage works, notably opéra comique.

Born in the French colony of Guadeloupe, his father, Georges Bologne de Saint-Georges, was a wealthy, white Plantation owner, while his mother was one of the Senegalese people Georges kept enslaved. (Note: Misled by Roger de Beauvoir's 1840 romantic novel Le Chevalier de Saint-Georges, many of his biographers confused Joseph's father with Jean de Boullonges, Controller-General of Finances, which, according to Banat, led to the erroneous spelling of the family name as "Boulogne", persisting to this day, even in records in the Bibliothèque nationale de France.) At the age of seven, he was taken to France where he began his formal education. As a young man he won a fencing contest leading to his appointment as a “gendarme de la garde du roi" by King Louis XVI. Having received music and musical composition lessons, he joined the orchestra Le Concert des Amateurs, culminating in his appointment as its conductor in 1773.

In 1776, Saint-Georges began conducting the Paris Opera. However, this prospect was thwarted by opposition from certain performers who resisted the idea of an individual of colour directing them. Around this time, he shifted his focus to composing operas. In 1781, he joined a new orchestra, Le Concert de la Loge Olympique. By 1785, he had stopped composing instrumental works altogether.

Following the outbreak of the French Revolution in 1789, Saint-Georges left for England. Upon his return to France, he joined the National Guard in Lille and then served as a colonel in the Légion St.-Georges, which comprised "citizens of colour". His social and professional ties to prominent figures such as Marie Antoinette and the Duke of Orléans made him a target of the Reign of Terror, culminating in a period of imprisonment spanning at least eleven months.

Saint-Georges, a contemporary of Mozart, has at times been called the "Black Mozart." Some have criticized this appellation as racist and a reductive description of his own musical ability, but others have used it to champion Saint-Georges. The violinist Randall Goosby said, "I prefer to think of Mozart as the white Chevalier."

== Early life ==
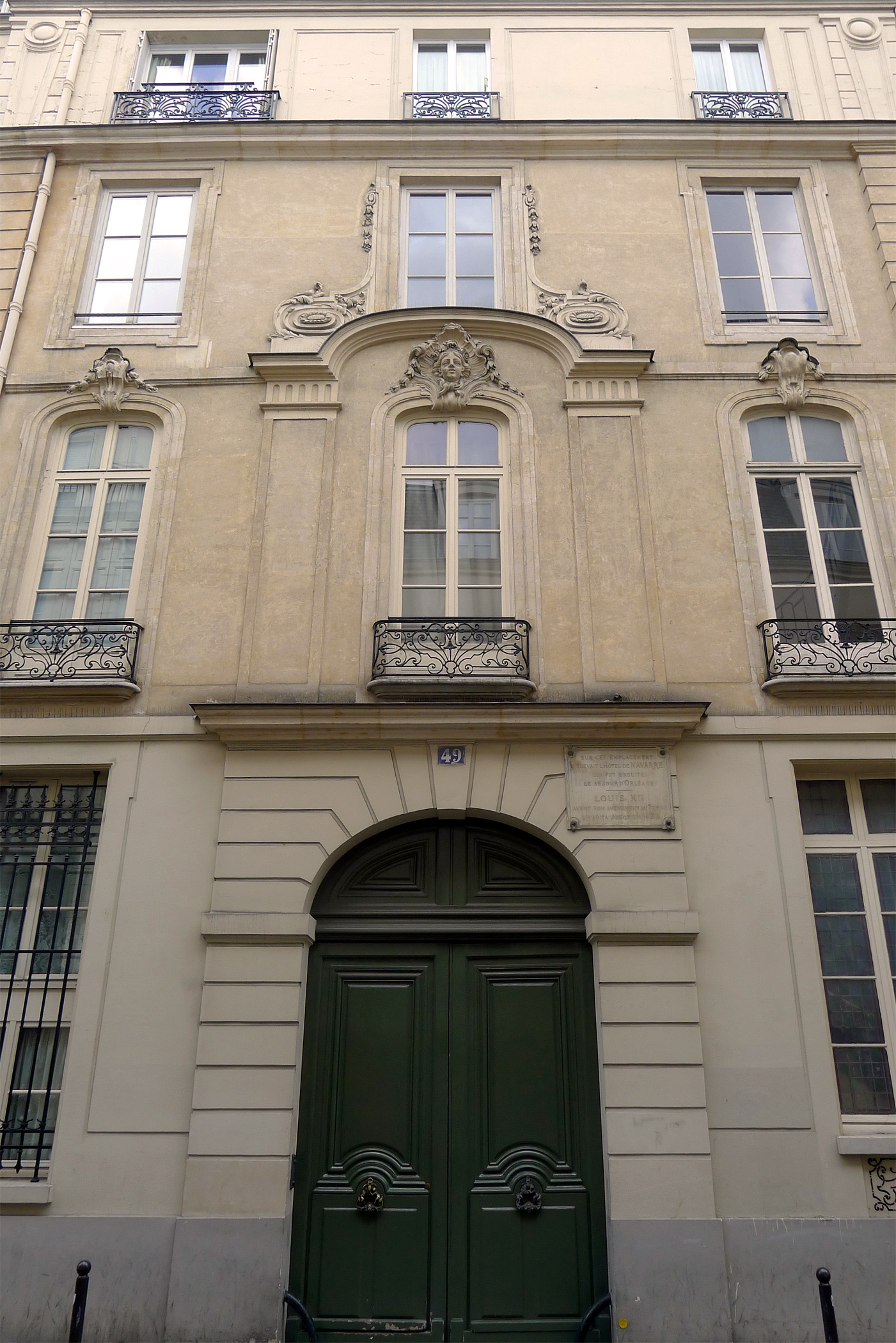
Rue Saint-André-des-Arts 49, the childhood home of Saint-Georges

Chevalier de Saint-Georges, also known as Joseph Bologne or Joseph Boulogne, was born on 25 December 1745 in Baillif, Basse-Terre, the illegitimate son of a settler and planter and slaveholder Georges Bologne de Saint-Georges and Nanon, a 17-year-old enslaved African who served within the family household. Bologne was legally married to Elisabeth Mérican (1722–1801), but acknowledged his son by Nanon and gave him his surname.

In 1747, Georges Bologne was accused of murder and fled to France. The next year he was visited by his wife, Nanon, and his son, Joseph. After two years Georges was granted a royal pardon and returned to Guadeloupe. In August 1753, Joseph aged seven, was taken to France for his education, and installed in a Jesuit boarding school in Angoulême so his uncle Pierre could keep an eye on him. The Bologne couple accompanied by his mother, Nanon, returned to Guadeloupe. Two years later, on 26 August 1755, listed as passengers on the ship L'Aimable Rose, Bologne de Saint-Georges and only Nanon landed in Bordeaux. Reunited with their son Joseph, they moved into a spacious apartment in the 6th Arrondissement (Rive Gauche).

At the age of 13, Joseph was enrolled in a private fencing academy run by Texier de La Boëssière in Rue Saint-Honoré across from the Oratoire du Louvre, practising horse riding in the Salle du Manège. According to Antoine la Boëssière, son of the Master, "At 15 his progress was so rapid, that he was already beating the best swordsmen, and at 17 he developed the greatest speed imaginable." Bologne was still a student when he defeated Alexandre Picard, a fencing master in Rouen, who had been mocking him in public as "Boëssière's upstart mulatto". That match, bet on heavily by a public divided into partisans and opponents of slavery, was an important episode for Bologne. His father rewarded Joseph with a horse and buggy.

His father, called "de Saint-Georges" after one of his plantations in Guadeloupe, was a commoner until 1757, when he acquired the title of Gentilhomme ordinaire de la chambre du roi (Gentleman of the King's Chamber). On 5 April 1762, King Louis XV decreed that "Nègres et gens de couleur", who were considered free once they set foot on French soil, must register with the clerk of the Admiralty within two months. This was likely because at the end of the Seven Years' War, blacks and free mulattos were seen as helpful as France was losing the war. Many leading French Enlightenment thinkers argued that Africans and their descendants were inferior to White Europeans, as exemplified by Voltaire's views on race and slavery.

After defeating Picard in 1761 or on graduation from the academy in 1766, Bologne was made a Gendarme du roi (officer of the king's bodyguard) in Versailles and a chevalier. He then adopted the suffix of his father's plantation and was known as the "Chevalier de Saint-Georges".

In 1764, his father returned to Guadeloupe, which had been occupied by the British during the Seven Years' War, to look after his sugar plantations. The following year, Georges made a last will and testament, in which he left Joseph an annuity of 8,000 francs and an adequate pension to Nanon, who remained with their son in Paris. When Georges Bologne died in 1774 in Guadeloupe, he awarded his annuity and two plantations (fr:Habitation-Sucrerie Clairefontaine) to his legitimate daughter, Elisabeth Benedictine. The younger Saint-Georges was ineligible under French law for titles of nobility due to his illegitimate status. Long before her death, Saint-George's mother, Nanon, recorded a testamentary deed dated 17 June 1778, in which she bequeathed all her belongings to her son as her universal legatee. She signed the document "Anne Danneveau" and her son signed as "Mr De Bolongna St-George".

He continued to fence daily in the fencing venues of Paris. There he met the fencing masters Domenico Angelo and his son Henry, the Chevalier d'Éon, and the teenage Louis Philippe II, Duke of Orléans, all of whom would play a role in his future.

On 17 May 1779, John Adams made an entry in his diary recounting St. George's larger-than-life reputation (and mistakenly calling him the son of a governor rather than a tax collector): "Lee gave Us an Account of St. George at Paris, a Molatto Man, Son of a former Governor of Guadaloupe, by a Negro Woman...He is the most accomplished Man in Europe in Riding, Running, Shooting, Fencing, Dancing, Musick. He will hit the Button, any Button on the Coat or Waistcoat of the greatest Masters. He will hit a Crown Piece in the Air with a Pistoll Ball."

== Musical life and career ==
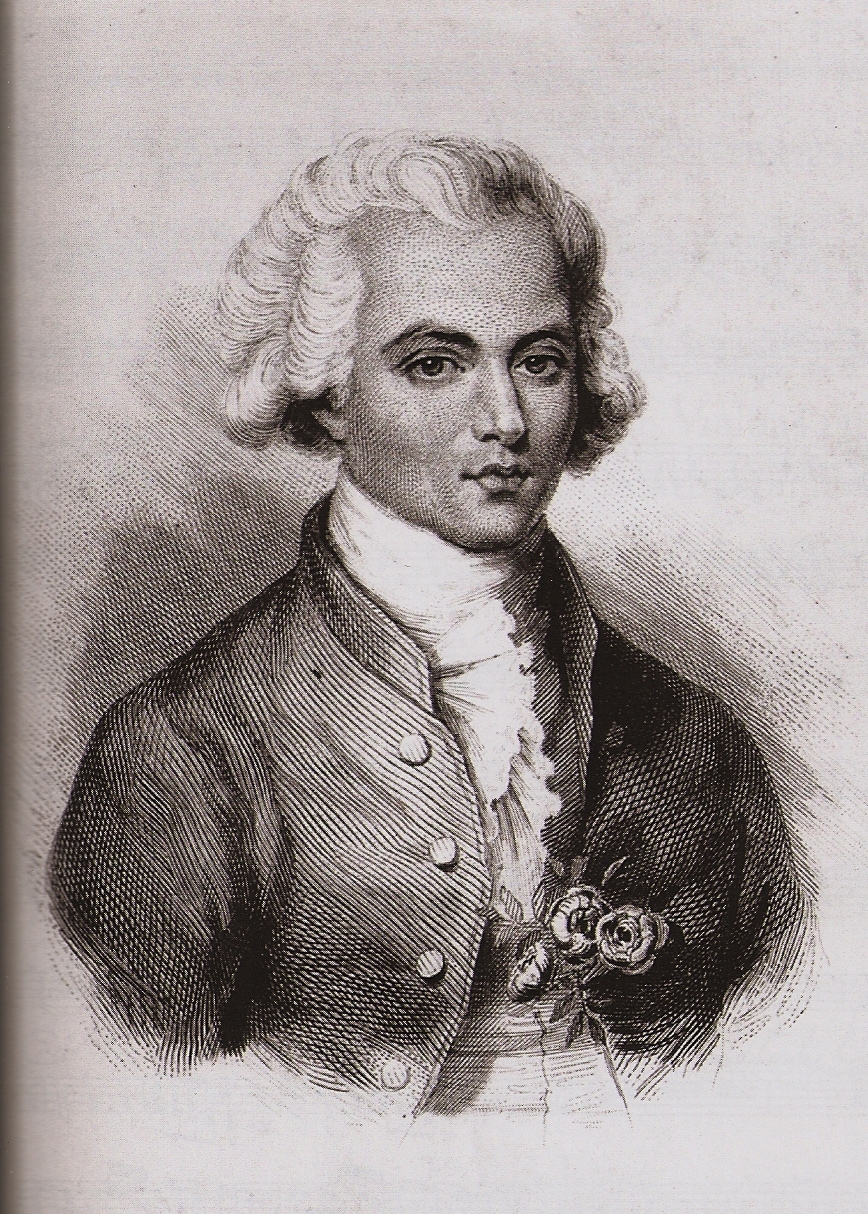
Idealized portrait of the young Saint-Georges drawn around 1840 by fr:Charles-Édouard de Beaumont, and published by Roger de Beauvoir. The three roses on his lapel are a Masonic symbol.

Little is known about the early musical training of Saint-Georges. He was sent to Paris to begin his musical studies at the age of seven. Given his prodigious technique as an adult, Saint-Georges must have practiced the violin seriously as a child. A biographer of Saint-Georges, Banat, discounted a claim by François-Joseph Fétis that Saint-Georges studied violin with Jean-Marie Leclair. Some of his technique was said to reveal the influence of Pierre Gaviniès.

In 1764, when violinist Antonio Lolli arrived in Paris, the Italian composed two concertos, Op. 2, for the chevalier. Lolli's dedication was to Joseph's father: "To M. de Bologne de Saint-Georges, who gave the arts a priceless gift in the person of his son." In 1766, François-Joseph Gossec dedicated a set of six string trios, Op. 9, to Saint-Georges. Lolli may have worked with Bologne on his violin technique and Gossec on compositions.

In 1769, the Parisian public was amazed to see Saint-Georges, well known for his fencing prowess, playing as a violinist in Gossec's new orchestra, Le Concert des Amateurs in the Hôtel de Soubise.

Saint-Georges's first composition Op. 1, probably composed in 1770 or 1771, was a set of six string quartets, among the first in France, published by famed French publisher, composer, and teacher Antoine Bailleux. He was inspired by Joseph Haydn's earliest quartets, brought from Vienna by Baron Bagge. Also in 1770, Carl Stamitz dedicated his own set of six string quartets to Saint-Georges. By 1771, Gossec had appointed Saint-Georges as the concert master of the Concert des Amateurs.

In 1772, Saint-Georges debuted as a soloist with the Concert des Amateurs. He played his first two violin concertos, Op. II, with Gossec conducting the orchestra. The concertos garnered a highly positive reception, and Saint-Georges, in particular, was said to be "appreciated not as much for his compositions as for his performances, enrapturing especially the feminine members of his audience".

In 1773, when Gossec took over the direction of the prestigious Concert Spirituel, (Note: From 1777 the Concert Spirituel was directed by Joseph Legros, its final director. Legros, a singer at the Paris Opéra, managed the concerts until they came to an end in May 1790.) he designated Saint-Georges as the new conductor of the Concert des Amateurs. After less than two years under Saint-George's' direction, the group was described by Jean-Benjamin de La Borde as "performing with great precision and delicate nuances", who also said it had become "the best orchestra for symphonies in Paris, and perhaps in all of Europe". (Note: Baron von Grimm comments that the members of the Concert des Amateurs objected to Saint-Georges's reputation "as a taskmaster".) Saint-Georges was chosen as the dedicatee of another composition in 1778, violinist Giovanni Avoglio's set of string quartets, Op. 6.

In 1781, after the Compte rendu detailing the deplorable state of the nation's finances was published, Saint Georges's Concert des Amateurs had to be disbanded for lack of funding. (Note: France had high debts accrued from the American Revolution. The USA was bankrupt because of the American War of Independence. Robert Morris issued the "Report on Public Credit", calling for the full payment of the country's war debt through new revenue measures.) Playwright, arms dealer, and Secret du Roi (spy) Pierre Caron de Beaumarchais began to collect funds from private contributors, including many of the Concert's patrons, to send aid for the American cause. Saint-Georges turned to his friend and admirer, Philippe d'Orléans, duc de Chartres, for help. (Note: In 1773, at the age of 26, Philippe had been elected Grand Master of the Grand Orient de France after the unification of all the Masonic organizations in France.) Responding to Saint-Georges's plea, Philippe revived the orchestra as part of the Loge Olympique, an exclusive Freemason Lodge. This orchestra was made up of the finest musicians in Paris who could qualify as members in the Freemasons.

Renamed Le Concert Olympique, with practically the same personnel, the orchestra performed in the Théâtre du Palais-Royal. In 1785, Count d'Ogny, the music coordinator of the Olympic Lodge since 1782 and a member of its cello section, commissioned Haydn to compose six new symphonies for the Concert Olympique. (Note: Haydn joined the Olympique lodge in 1785. Saint-Georges was eligible to join the Grand Orient de France from 1773 or Les Neuf Sœurs from 1776.) He asked Saint-Georges to write to Haydn and settle the details. Conducted by Saint-Georges, Haydn's Paris symphonies were first performed at the Salle des Gardes-Suisses of the Tuileries, a much larger hall, in order to accommodate the huge public demand to hear Haydn's new works. Queen Marie Antoinette attended some of Saint-Georges's concerts at the Hôtel de Soubise, arriving sometimes without notice, so the orchestra wore court attire for all its performances. In 1786, the musicians played "in embroidered suits, lace cuffs, swords at their sides and feathered hats on the benches. Such an orchestra was a sight to behold, and no less pleasant to listen to." Brilliant technical effects were made possible by the new bow perfected by Francois Tourte.

== Operas ==
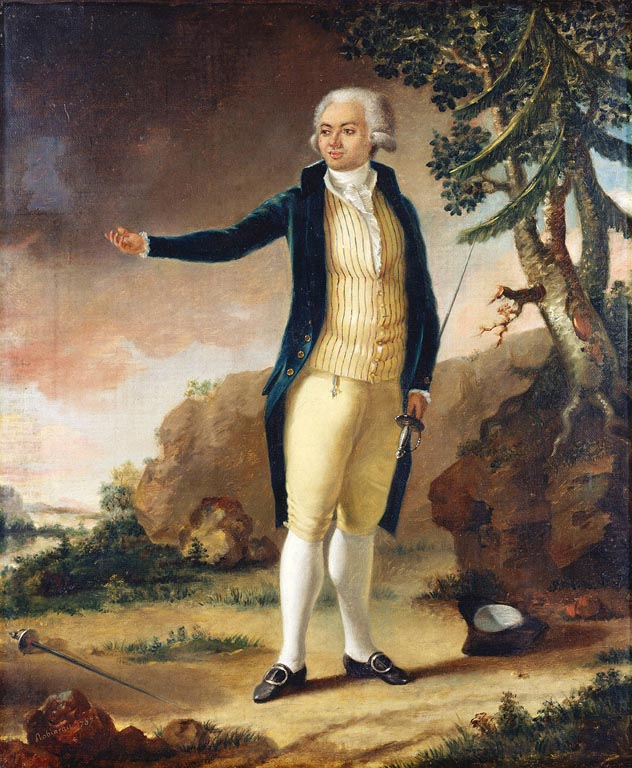
Chevalier de St-Georges by Abbé Alexandre-Auguste Robineau (1787).

Early in 1776, the Académie royale de Musique, the Paris Opéra, was struggling financially and artistically. Saint-Georges was proposed as the next director of the opera. (Perhaps by Denis-Pierre-Jean Papillon de la Ferté, intendant of the Menus-Plaisirs du Roi, but he does not mention Saint-Georges at all.) As the creator of the first disciplined French orchestra since Lully, Saint-Georges was the obvious choice. But, according to Baron von Grimm's Correspondence litteraire, philosophique et critique, three of the Opéra's leading ladies (Marie-Madeleine Guimard, Rosalie Levasseur, and Sophie Arnould) petitioned the Queen in January in opposition to his appointment, saying "that their honor and delicate conscience could never allow them to submit to the orders of a mulatto". The position was given to Antoine Dauvergne instead.

To defuse the brewing scandal, Louis XVI, then only one year on the throne, took the Opéra back from the city of Paris to be managed by his Intendant of Menus-Plaisirs du Roi. Marie-Antoinette preferred to hold her musicales in the salon of her private apartment in the palace, or in the recently established Théâtre de la Reine in the gardens of Versailles. She limited the audience to her intimate circle and a few musicians, among them the Chevalier de Saint-Georges. "Admitted to perform music with the Queen", Saint-Georges probably played his violin sonatas, with the Queen playing the fortepiano. (Note: Under the teaching of Gluck, Marie Antoinette developed into a good musician. She learned to play the harp, the harpsichord, and the flute. She sang during the family's evening gatherings, as she had a beautiful voice. She owned several instruments and many books on music. From 1788 she owned a piano made by Sébastien Érard.)

The petition by the singers may have ended Saint-Georges's aspirations to higher positions as a musician. Over the next two years, he published two more violin concertos and a pair of Symphonies concertantes. Thereafter, except for his final set of quartets (Op. 14, 1785), Saint-Georges abandoned composing instrumental music in favor of opera. He was still acquainted and remained friendly with several composers (notably, Salieri, Gretry, and Gluck).

Ernestine, Saint-Georges's first opera, with a libretto by Pierre Choderlos de Laclos, the notorious author of Les Liaisons dangereuses, was performed on 19 July 1777, at the Comédie-Italienne. It did not survive its premiere. The critics liked the music, but panned the weak libretto, which was then usually judged more important than the music. The Queen attended with her entourage to support Saint-Georges's opera but, after the audience kept echoing a character cracking his whip and crying "Ohé, Ohé," the Queen gave it the coup de grace by calling to her driver: "to Versailles, Ohé!"

After the failure of the opera, Saint-Georges was in financial trouble. Madame de Montesson, the morganatic wife of the Duc d'Orléans, realized her ambition to engage Saint-Georges as music director of her fashionable private theater. From 5 July to 11 September 1778, Saint-Georges lived at Grimm's residence in Chaussée d'Antin, as did Mozart, who moved in after his mother died; both left in September. The Duc d'Orléans appointed Saint-Georges as Lieutenant de la chasse of his vast hunting grounds at Raincy, with an additional salary of 2000 Livres a year. "Saint-Georges the mulatto so strong, so adroit, was one of the hunters..."

Saint-Georges wrote and rehearsed his second opera, appropriately entitled La Chasse (The Hunt), at Raincy. At its premiere in the Théâtre Italien, "The public received the work with loud applause. Vastly superior compared with Ernestine... there is every reason to encourage him to continue [writing operas]." La Chasse was repeated at her Majesty's request at the royal chateau at Marly. Saint-Georges's most successful opéra comique was L'amant anonyme, which was premiered in 1780, with a libretto based on a play of the same name by Madame de Montesson's niece, Madame de Genlis. (Note: L'Amant Anonyme is Saint-Georges's sole opera to be found intact, and is listed in BnF, section musique, côte 4076)

In 1785, the Duke of Orléans died. Madame de Montesson, having been forbidden by the King to mourn him, shuttered their mansion, closed her theater, and retired to a convent for about a year. With his patrons gone, Saint-Georges lost not only his positions but also his apartment. His friend, Louis Philippe, now Duke of Orléans, presented him with a small flat in the Palais-Royal, opposite the Louvre. Saint-Georges was drawn into the whirlpool of political and social activity around Philippe and Brissot de Warville, admirers of the British parliamentary system and the constitutional monarchy, the main opposition to the French absolute monarchy.

Meanwhile, the Duke's ambitious plans for re-constructing the Palais-Royal left the Orchestre Olympique without a home and Saint-Georges unemployed. Seeing his protégé at loose ends and recalling that the Prince of Wales often expressed a wish to meet the legendary fencer, Philippe approved Brissot's plan to dispatch Saint-Georges to London. He believed it was a way to ensure the Regent-in-waiting's support of Philippe as the future "Regent" of France. But Brissot had a secret agenda as well. He considered Saint-Georges, a "man of color", the ideal person to contact his fellow abolitionists in London and ask their advice about Brissot's plans for Les Amis des Noirs (Friends of the Blacks) modeled on the English Society for Effecting the Abolition of the Slave Trade.

== Social life in Paris ==
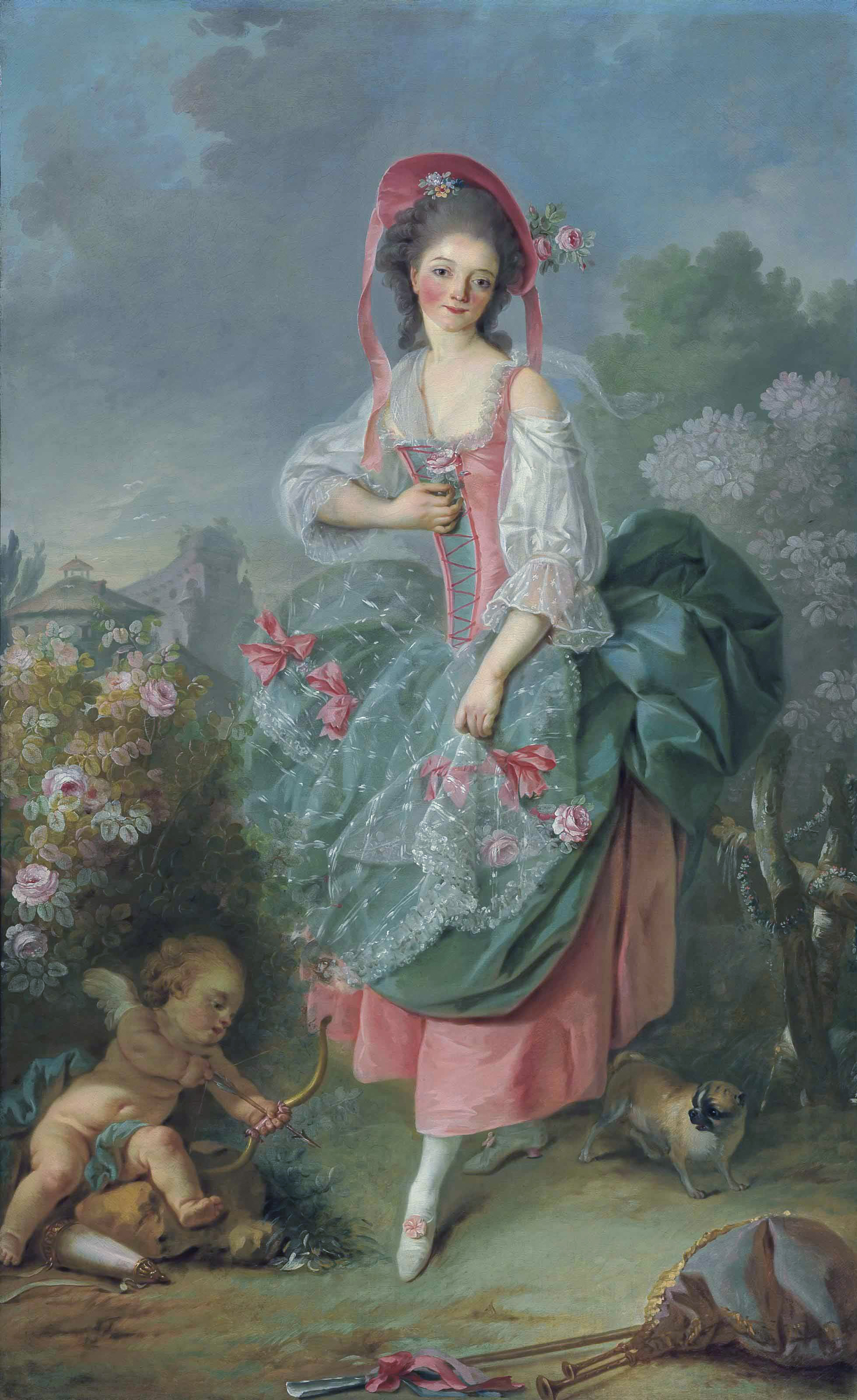
Mademoiselle Guimard as Terpsichore (Jacques-Louis David, 1773–1775)

At the fencing academy, Joseph met Chevalier Lamotte, who became a horn player in the King's orchestra (until October 1789). According to Louise Fusil, a singer, the two were inseparable; she compared them with Pylades and his cousin Orestes. According to her Saint-Georges was: "...admired for his fencing and riding prowess, he served as a model to young sportsmen... who formed a court around him." A fine dancer, Saint-Georges was invited to balls and welcomed in the salons of highborn ladies. "He was often indebted to music for liaisons in which love played a part. Gifted with vivid expression he loved and made himself loved."

During his time at the opera and before the revolution, Saint-Georges became involved with many women in Paris society. Joseph Bologne is supposed to have had at least one long-term, serious romantic relationship. One potential suitor of his was the famous, rich and clever dancer Marie-Madeleine Guimard, whose advances he declined. She became the lover of Papillon de la Ferté. Having been spurned, and with great influence on the Queen's court, La Guimard, treasurer of the Opera, owner of Hôtel Guimard that included a 500-seat theatre, would come to play a pivotal role in the petition that would deny Joseph's ambition to become the director of the Paris Opera from ever coming to fruition.

Pierre Le Fèvre de Beauvray, a gossip writer at the time, and author of a work entitled "Journal d'un bourgeois de Popincourt", attributes to Saint-Georges a love affair with the Marquise Marie-Josephine de Montalembert, salonnière, and novelist, the young wife of an old general. Her husband (Marc René, marquis de Montalembert) was a general of military engineering in the Queen's Court; his wife was said to have been drawn to the young composer. Their affair was discovered and it was rumored by Louis Petit de Bachaumont they had a child. (Note: In 1779, the Marquis and Choderlos de Laclos lived on Île-d'Aix involved in the construction of fortifications against the British.)

=== St. Georges assaulted ===
One evening, around midnight, Saint-Georges was attacked in the streets of Paris when returning home (in the Rue de la Chaussée-d'Antin). In his Secret Memoirs, Bachaumont mentions that the attack took place on the night of 1 May 1779. Saint-Georges and his friend valiantly defended themselves and were providentially saved by the night watch and its men-at-arms:

« M. de Saint Georges is a mulatto, that is to say the son of a negress […] Recently, during the night, he was attacked by six men, he was with one of his friends, they defended themselves to the best of their ability against sticks with which the fellows wanted to knock them down; there is even talk of a pistol shot which was heard: the lookout occurred & prevented the consequences of this assassination, - so that Mr. de Saint Georges is freed for bruises & minor injuries; he even shows himself already in the world. Several of the killers have been arrested. M. le Duc d'Orléans wrote to M. le Noir, as soon as he was informed of the fact, to recommend to him the most exact research, and that a striking justice be done on the culprits. After 24 hours Mr. the Duke of Orléans was asked not to interfere in this affair, and the prisoners, who were recognized as policemen, among whom was a certain Desbrugnieres, so renowned in the affair of the Comte de Morangiès, were released, which gives rise to a thousand conjectures. »

It was suggested that the Marquis de Montalembert, eager to avenge his honour and punish the "seducer" of his wife by setting up a night operation, might have been behind the nocturnal aggression. According to Claude Ribbe the attackers were secret policemen from Versailles; the duke of Orléans was asked not to interfere. Pierre Bardin exhumed from the archives of the Commissaire au Châtelet a document which is not published. He concluded that there was an "error on the person" that day. It was not Saint-George who was targeted by a scorned husband, but his friend baron Gillier, comte de Saint-Julien? The sponsor of this aggression would be a famous actor, named Gourgaud said Dugazon, the husband of Louise-Rosalie Lefebvre, gifted vocalist, which had made its debut in Paris in "Ernestine" the opera by Saint-Georges.

== Two trips to London ==
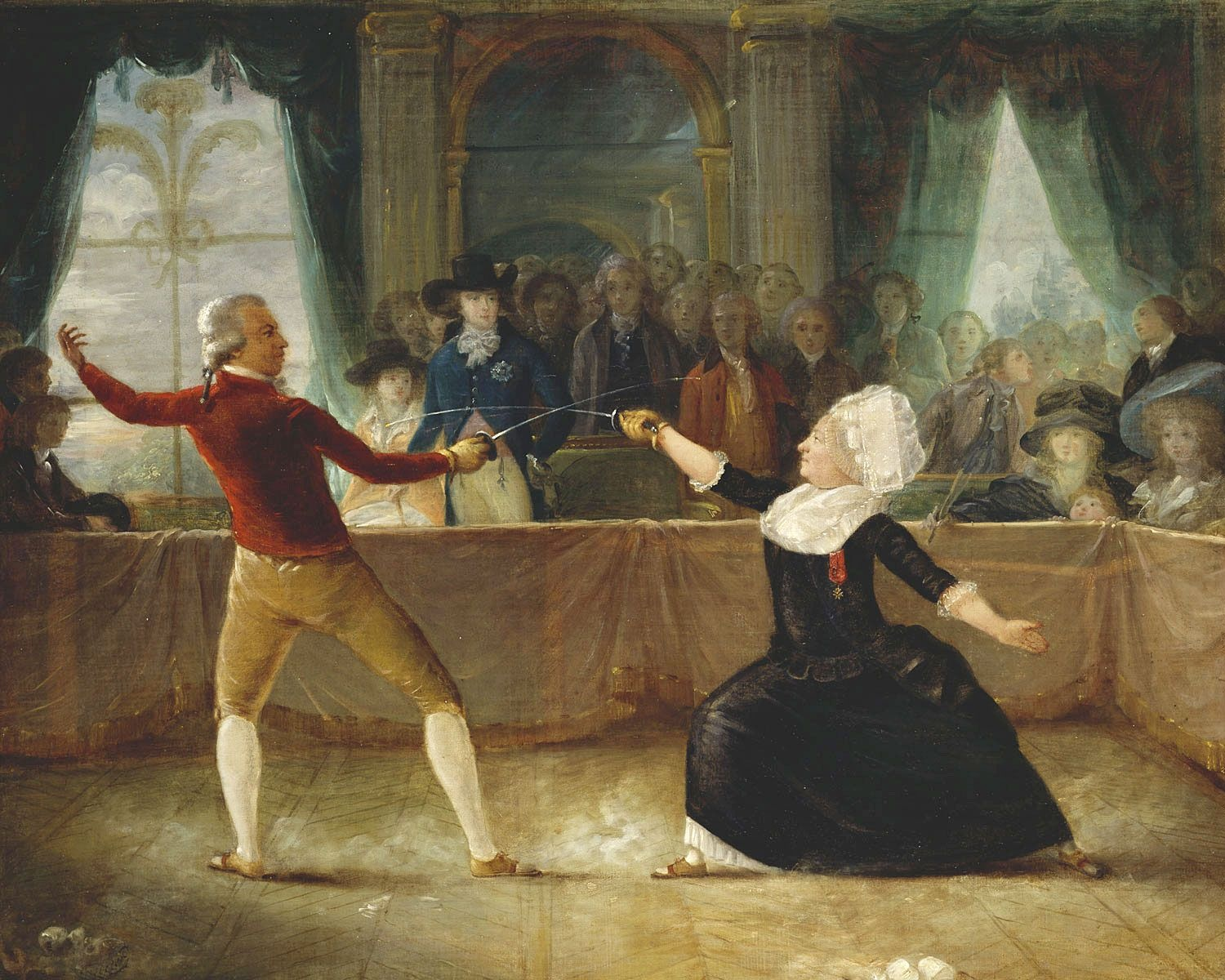
Fencing Match between St.-Georges and 'La chevalière d'Éon' a Secret du Roi, transvestite at Carlton House on 9 April 1787, by Abbé Alexandre-Auguste Robineau

In Spring 1787, Saint-Georges stayed in London with fencing masters Domenico Angelo and Henry, his son, whom he knew as an apprentice from early years in Paris. They arranged exhibition matches for him, including one at Carlton House, before the Prince of Wales. After sparring with him, carte and tierce, the prince matched Saint-Georges with several renowned masters. One included La Chevalière d'Éon, aged 59, in a voluminous black frock. A painting by Abbé Alexandre-Auguste Robineau, violinist-composer, and painter, showed the Prince and his entourage watching Mlle D'Éon score a hit on Saint-Georges, giving rise to rumors that the Frenchman allowed it out of gallantry for a lady. But, as Saint-Georges had fenced with dragoon Captain d'Éon in Paris, he probably was deferring to her age. Saint-Georges played one of Robineau's concertos at the Anacreontic Society. It is supposed he delivered Brissot's request to translate the publications of the abolitionists MPs William Wilberforce, John Wilkes, and Reverend Thomas Clarkson into French. Before Saint-Georges left England, Mather Brown painted his portrait and presented it to Henry. Asked by Mrs. Angelo if it was a true likeness, Saint-Georges replied: "Alas, Madame it is frightfully so."

Back in Paris, he completed and produced his latest opéra comique, La Fille Garçon, at the Théâtre des Italiens. The critics found the libretto wanting. "The piece, [was] sustained only by the music of Monsieur de Saint Georges... The success he obtained should serve as an encouragement to continue enriching this theatre with his productions."

Meanwhile, having nearly completed the reconstruction of the Palais-Royal, the Duke had opened several new theaters. The smallest was the Théâtre Beaujolais, a marionette theater for children, named after his youngest son, the Duc de Beaujolais. The lead singers of the Opéra provided the voices for the puppets. Saint-Georges wrote the music of Le Marchand de Marrons (The Chestnut Vendor) for this theater, with a libretto by Madame de Genlis, Philippe's former mistress and then confidential adviser.

While Saint-Georges was away, the Concert Olympique had resumed performing at the Hôtel de Soubise, the old hall of the Amateurs. The Italian violinist Jean-Baptiste Viotti had been appointed as conductor. On 5 May 1789, the opening day of the fateful Estates General, Saint-Georges, standing in the gallery with Laclos, heard Jacques Necker, Louis XVI's minister of finance, saying, "The slave trade is a barbarous practice and must be eliminated." Choderlos de Laclos, who replaced Brissot as Philippe's chief of staff, intensified Brissot's campaign to promote Philippe as an alternative to the monarchy. On 14 July 1789, the fall of the Bastille took place, starting the French Revolution.

Although a free man of color, Saint-Georges was seen as a mulatto and was affected by the racism and racist laws in pre-Revolutionary France. After the abolition of feudalism in France Saint-Georges refrained from using his title "chevalier", and was addressed as "citoyen". On 26 August 1789, the assembly declared equal rights to all French people, but Saint-Georges wasn't there.

=== Second trip ===
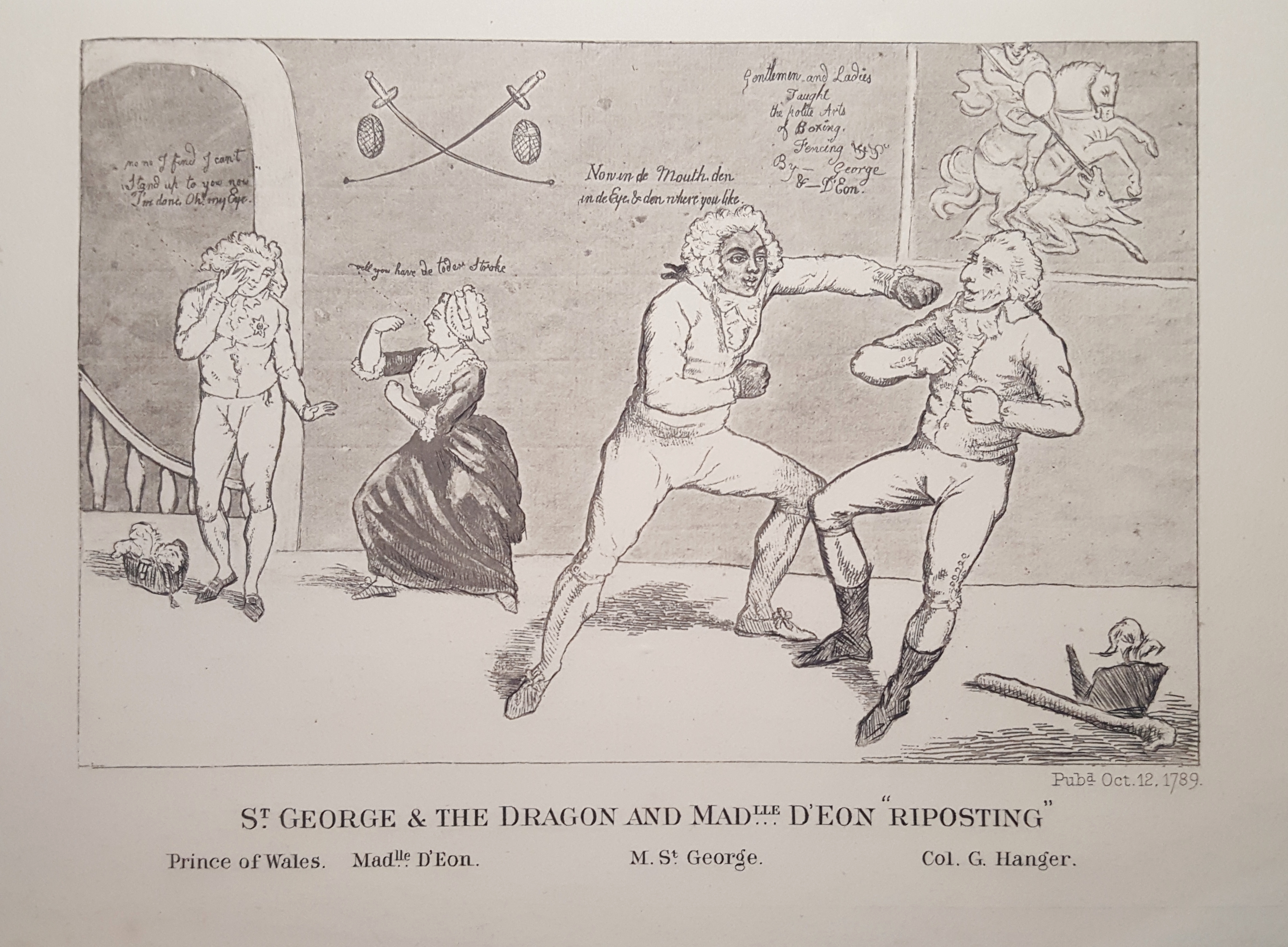
A cartoon of the Chevalier fencing with Colonel Hanger captioned "St. George & the Dragon" appeared in the Morning Post on 12 April 1789. St. Georges boxing with Col. Hanger backed up by "Mlle" d'Éon and the Prince of Wales with a black eye. On the wall a print of Saint George and the dragon

Early in August 1789, Saint-Georges was sent by Laclos on a secret mission to London for his employer, the Duke of Orléans, Bardin suggests. (His connections to the court may have played a role to leave the country.) Saint-Georges stayed at Grenier's an expensive hotel on Jermyn Street that later became patronized by French refugees. Saint-Georges had the idea of establishing in England and was entertaining himself lavishly. His assignment was to stay close to the Prince of Wales, known for his excessive lifestyle. On 15 August, the Prince took Saint-Georges to his Marine Pavilion in Brighton for a fencing match. He also took him fox hunting and to the races at Newmarket. After the Women's March on Versailles, the Duke was accused of initiating it. Marquis de La Fayette, probably jealous of the Duke's popularity, persuaded the king to send him on a mission to England. When he arrived on 14 October, he became the Prince's regular companion. They amused themselves with horse racing, young women, and champagne; nevertheless Saint-Georges was invited separately.

On his first trip Saint-Georges passed Brissot's request to the British abolitionists, they complied by translating their publications into French for his fledgling Société des amis des Noirs. Banat assumes Saint-Georges met with them again, but Adam Hochschild in Bury the Chains did not find any trace of this. Abbé Grégoire regretted Saint-Georges never joined the radical clubs, like the Jacobins, or the Société des amis des Noirs. It appears Saint-Georges was more a moderate democrat, influenced by the ideas of the Patriotic Society of 1789.

In late June 1790, Philippe Égalité, dubbed "The Red Duke" in London, realized that his "mission" there was a ruse used by the French king to get him out of the country. Philippe clung to a vague promise made by King Louis to make him Regent of the Southern Netherlands. Saint-Georges was unable to pay his bill at Grenier's but found a solution and organized a match. The next day they traveled to Belgium. On their journey, Saint-Georges was attacked again:

"Early in July, walking home from Greenwich, a man armed with a pistol demanded his purse. The Chevalier disarmed the man... but when four more rogues hidden until then attacked him, he put them all out of commission. M. de Saint Georges received only some contusions which did not keep him from going on that night to play music in the company of friends." The nature of the attack, with four attackers emerging after the first one made sure they had the right victim, has been claimed to be an assassination attempt disguised as a hold-up, arranged by the "Slave Trade" to put an end to his abolitionist activities.

In Brussels the people wanted a United Belgium Republic and rejected Philippe. Not long after the Duke went back to Paris, but Saint-Georges decided to join a fencing tournament in Lille.

== Lille ==
"On Thursday 8 July 1790, in Lille's municipal ballroom, the famous Saint-Georges was the principal antagonist in a brilliant fencing tournament. Although ill, he fought with that grace that is his trademark. Lightning is no faster than his arms and in spite of running a fever, he demonstrated astonishing vigour." Two days later looking worse but in need of funds, he offered another assault, this one for the officers of the garrison. But his illness proved so serious that it sent him to bed for six long weeks. The diagnosis according to medical science at the time was "brain fever". Unconscious for days, he was taken in and nursed by some kind citizens of Lille. While still bedridden Saint-Georges began to compose an opera for Lille's theater company. Calling it Guillome tout Coeur, ou les amis du village, he dedicated it to the citizens of Lille. "Guillaume is an opera in one act. The music by Saint-George is full of sweet warmth of motion and spirit...Its [individual] pieces are distinguished by their melodic lines and the vigor of their harmony. The public...made the hall resound with its justly deserved applause." It was to be his last opera, lost, including its libretto. He participated in local events and took charge of the music.

The singer Louise Fusil, who had idolized Saint-Georges since she was a girl of 15, wrote: "In 1791, I stopped in Amiens where St. Georges and Lamothe were waiting for me, committed to giving some concerts over the Easter holidays. We were to repeat them in Tournai in June. But the French refugees assembled in that town just across the border, could not abide the Créole they believed to be an agent of the despised Duke of Orléans. St. Georges was even advised [by its commandant] not to stop there for long." According to a report by a local newspaper: "The dining room of the hotel where St. Georges, a citizen of France, was also staying, refused to serve him, but he remained perfectly calm; remarkable for a man with his means to defend himself."

Fusil describes the scenario of the Saint-Georges work, "Love and Death of the Poor Little Bird", a programmatic piece for violin alone, which he was constantly entreated to play, especially by the ladies. Its three parts depicted the little bird greeting the spring; passionately pursuing the object of his love, who alas, has chosen another; its voice grows weaker then, after the last sigh, it is stilled forever. This kind of programme music or sound painting of scenarios such as love scenes, tempests, or battles complete with cannonades and the cries of the wounded, conveyed by a lone violin, was by that time nearly forgotten. Fusil places his improvisational style on a par with her subsequent musical idol, Hector Berlioz: "We did not know then this expressive ...depiction a dramatic scene, which Mr. Berlioz later revealed to us... making us feel an emotion that identifies us with the subject."

== Military career ==
On 22 May 1790 the right to declare war was given to the national assembly. Saint-Georges decided to serve the Revolution as a citizen-soldier. In September 1790, having recovered, Saint-Georges was one of the first in Lille to join its Garde Nationale. But not even his military duties in the Garde Nationale could prevent Saint-Georges from giving concerts. Once again he was building an orchestra which, according to the announcement in the paper, "Will give a concert every week until Easter." At the conclusion of the last concert, the mayor of Lille placed a crown of laurels on Saint-Georges' brow and read a poem dedicated to him.

In April and June 1791, the Parliament recruited (400,000) volunteers from the entire French National Guard for the French Revolutionary Army. Leopold II (1747-1792), (sensible) brother of Marie Antoinette, became increasingly concerned although he still hoped to avoid war.

With 50,000 Austrian troops massed on its borders, the first citizen's army in modern history was calling for volunteers. Saint-Georges was appointed captain and colonel in the following year. It was believed he died in a pistol fight in Koblenz, but on 7 September 1791 he published a letter announcing he wasn't dead.

On 20 April 1792, compelled by the National Assembly, Louis XVI declared war against Archduchy of Austria. General Dillon, commander of Lille, was ordered to attack Tournai, reportedly only lightly defended. Instead, massive fire by the Austrian artillery turned an orderly retreat into a rout by the regular cavalry, but not that of the volunteers of the National Guard. Captain St. Georges commanded the company of volunteers that held the line at Baisieux near the Belgian border. Mid August Marquis Lafayette hoping to travel to the United States, was taken prisoner by the Austrians.

On 7 September 1792, Julien Raimond, leader of a delegation of free men of color from Saint-Domingue (Haiti), petitioned the National Assembly to authorize the formation of a military legion of volunteers. The next day, the Parliament established a light cavalry in Lille consisting of volunteers from the French West Indies and Le Midi. The name of it was "Légion franche de cavalerie des Américains et du Midi"; after 7 December it was referred to as "American Legion" and "Légion de Saint-George", attached to the Army of the North (France). (Note: Americans, meaning from French Antilles, France's American colonies) Banat described it as "probably the first all non-white military unit" (in Europe). The legion comprised seven companies, of which only one was made up of colored men, while the remainder comprised European-whites. On 25 September the Austrian army started to bombard Lille. In February 1793, lacking not only infantry, but equipment, and officers, the American Legion changed its name and became "13e régiment de chasseurs à cheval".

On 20 March 1793, the National Convention sent Danton, the instigator of the Revolutionary Tribunal, and Delacroix to Leuven to investigate Dumouriez during War with the Dutch Republic and his generals. (Note: Francisco de Miranda the only general from South-America, operating in the Austrian Netherlands was sent to Paris for investigation. De Miranda leading the "Armée de la Belgique" and John Skey Eustace, the only general from the USA, blamed Dumouriez for the defeat. An investigation by Fouquier-Tinville followed on 16–17 May into the military leadership of Miranda and Miaczinsky. In July Miranda was imprisoned for 1.5 year.) At the end of the month five commissioners (led by Pierre de Ruel, marquis de Beurnonville) were sent to question and arrest him. Dumouriez sensed a trap and invited them to his headquarters at Saint-Amand-les-Eaux and had them arrested at Orchies. They were escorted by Saint-Georges, who immediately drove back. On 2 April the city of Lille was successfully defended by Saint-Georges against Jozef Miaczinsky who was sent by Dumouriez to seize the city, to arrest the other commissioners and save the "treasure". His troops were forced to camp outside the city walls.

Because of a ceasefire no troops were allowed to cross the border. Dumouriez' plans to reinstall the French Constitution of 1791, and restore the monarchy in Paris (with Duke of Chartres who had to marry Marie-Thérèse, Duchess of Angoulême imprisoned in the Temple, Paris) fell apart. On 4 April the convention declared Dumouriez a traitor and outlaw and put a prize on his head. Dumouriez's defection on the next day changed the course of the events for the Brissotins. (Note: Dumouriez blamed the famous mulatto for thwarting his plans. Saint-Georges prohibited the arrest of the other commissioners and couriers in Lille; instead Miaczinsky was arrested, transported to Paris, tried, and executed.) Robespierre was convinced Brissot and Dumouriez wanted to overthrow the French First Republic. On 6 April, the Committee of Public Safety was installed. Philippe Égalité was then put under continuous surveillance.

On 6 May, Saint-Georges was invited by the accusateur public to Paris to witness against Miaczinsky. On 4 and 10 May, he was accused by Stanislas-Marie Maillard, and Louis Héron. On 16 May, his house was searched and bonds were found belonging to Philippe Égalité and Dumouriez. (Note: On 17 May, several officers of the American Legion signed an "Address to the Convention, to all the Clubs and societies patriotic for the negroes held in slavery in the French colonies".) On 17 May, the trial against general Miaczinsky started (headed by Jacques-Bernard-Marie Montané); Captain Collin was interrogated. On 18 May, Saint-Georges, dressed as a civilian, performed a requiem by Gossec for the murdered general Théobald Dillon and the other victims in Lille. In the following weeks, Saint-Georges was accused of misusing government funds, and the Legion disbanded. On 25 September 1793, Saint-Georges and ten of his officers were dismissed.

On 29 September, he was arrested without specific charges, according to Banat. (On 17 September, the Law of Suspects was passed, which authorized the imprisonment of vaguely defined "suspects".) It is supposed he was suspected of having been friendly with Marie-Antoinette, Brissot, and Philippe Égalité, all executed in the following weeks. Saint-Georges was sent to Chateau de Chantilly which served as a prison for political opponents (the Girondins) and then to Hondainville at chateau Saint-Aignan, formerly owned by the Comte de Saint-Morys. Early December 1793 it seems, he was condemned for being involved in non-revolutionary activities such as music events, but not much is known about a trial; maybe there never was one. He was released after eleven months, on 24 October 1794, and asked to be reinstated in the army on 3 April 1795. One month later he was arrested again, when White Terror was sweeping the country but released on 15 May. Five days later the Sans-culottes were defeated (in the Revolt of 1 Prairial Year III); on 22 August 1795, the Constitution of the Year III established a bicameral legislature, intended to slow down the legislative process.

On 19 October, all the officers in the army, including the ones who were dismissed, had to clarify for the Committee of Public Safety where they were on the days around 13 Vendémiaire. On 24 October, Saint-Georges was dismissed. On Sunday, 25 October, the National Convention declared itself dissolved and voted for a general amnesty for "deeds exclusively connected with the Revolution". A slimmed-down government (the Directoire) started working and appointed Napoleon as General in Chief of the Interior and 2 March 1796 of the Army of Italy.

On 3 May 1797, Saint-Georges tried to join and signed his petition "George". He wrote:

"I continue to show loyalty to the revolution. Since the beginning of the war, I have been serving with relentless enthusiasm, but the persecution I suffered has not diminished. I have no other resources, only to restore my original position." However, his application to Rewbell, a member of the French Directory, failed again.

One of the decisions of Napoleon as First Consul for life was the re-establishment of slavery (Law of 20 May 1802) revoking the Law of 4 February 1794 which had abolished slavery in all the French colonies.

== Possible Saint-Domingue visit ==
Some biographers claim that Saint-Georges would have stayed in Saint-Domingue, where he would have met with Toussaint Louverture. However, the stay of Saint-Georges in Saint-Domingue, after his imprisonment, is uncertain. There may be confusion with another legend, his stay on the island of Martinique in December 1789. A newspaper mentioned that on request of Martinique Saint-Georges arrived there with 15,000 rifles in early December 1789. In fact he was with the Duke of Orléans in London and afterward Lille.

It stands to reason that Julien Raimond would want to take Saint-Georges, an experienced officer, with him to Saint-Domingue, then in a civil war. While we lack concrete evidence that Saint-Georges was aboard the convoy of the commission, the fact that we find Captain Colin, and Lamotte (Lamothe) on the payroll of a ship of the convoy to Saint-Domingue, confirms Louise Fusil's account. So does Lionel de La Laurencie's statement: "The expedition to Saint-Domingue was Saint-Georges' last voyage," adding that "Disenchantment and melancholy resulting from his experiences during that voyage must have weighed heavily on his aging shoulders" Anyhow, the memoirs of Louise Fusil are full of inaccuracies, errors, or counter-truths.

It seems unlikely that Saint-Georges had been a part of the official delegation of commissioners civilians sent to Saint-Domingue with their head Léger-Félicité Sonthonax, the friend of Jacques Pierre Brissot, the founder of the Society of the Friends of the Blacks. Historians have found to this day no trace of Saint-Georges in the press of the time, or in the archives of the manifests of ships bound for French ports for Saint-Domingue or making trips back in France. It is believed that after his ouster of the armies of the Revolution, Saint-Georges would not have left Europe.

On 16 December 1795, his mother died, and on 29 March 1796, he signed as the executor of her will. It is likely he inherited some money and property. On 19 April 1796 he and Lamothe, the horn player, gave a concert, for the impoverished Carl Stamitz.

Saint-Georges was again building a symphony orchestra. Like his last ensemble, Le Cercle de l'Harmonie was also part of a Masonic lodge performing in what was formerly the Palais Royal. The founders of the new Loge, a group of nouveau riche gentlemen bent on re-creating the elegance of the old Loge Olympique, were delighted to find Saint-Georges back in Paris. On 11 and 28 April 1797, he gave concerts in the Palais-Égalité. According to Le Mercure Français, "The concerts ... under the direction of the famous Saint Georges, left nothing to be desired as to the choice of pieces or the superiority of their execution". More concerts took place in July and August 1798.

== Death ==
Report of the removal of Saint-Georges's body on 10 June 1799

According to a number of his biographers, at the end of his life, Saint-Georges lived in abject poverty, but the Cercle did not sound like the lower depths. Rejected by the army, Saint-Georges appealed again saying "I have no other resources" but was still rejected. Instead, at the age of 51, he found solace in his music. Sounding like any veteran performer proud of his longevity, he said: "Towards the end of my life, I was particularly devoted to my violin," adding: "never before did I play it so well!" Two of his contemporary obituaries reveal the course of his illness and death.

La Boëssière fils: "Saint-Georges felt the onset of a disease of the bladder and, given his usual negligence, paid it little attention; he even kept secret an ulcer, source of his illness; gangrene set in.
J.S.A. Cuvelier in his Necrology: "For some time he had been tormented by a violent fever... his vigorous nature had repeatedly fought off this cruel illness; [but] after a month of suffering, the end came on 21 Prairial [9 June] at five o'clock in the evening. Sometime before the end, St. Georges stayed with a friend [Captain Duhamel] in the rue Boucherat. His death was marked by the calm of the wise and the dignity of the strong."

Captain Nicholas Duhamel, an officer in Légion St.-Georges and aide-de-camp of General Miaczinsky, was his friend until his death. Concerned about his old colonel's condition, he stopped by Chevalier's small flat on rue de Chartres-Saint-Honoré and, having found him dying and alone, took him to his apartment, where he stayed and was cared for until his death. Saint-Georges died aged 53 in June 1799. His death certificate was lost in 1871 when the city archives were destroyed; what remains is a report by the men who removed his body on the next day.

This year died, twenty-four days apart, two extraordinary
but very different men, Beaumarchais and Saint-Georges;
both Masters at sparring; the one who could be touched by a
foil was not the one who was more enviable for his virtues.
— Charles Maurice (1799)

== Legacy ==
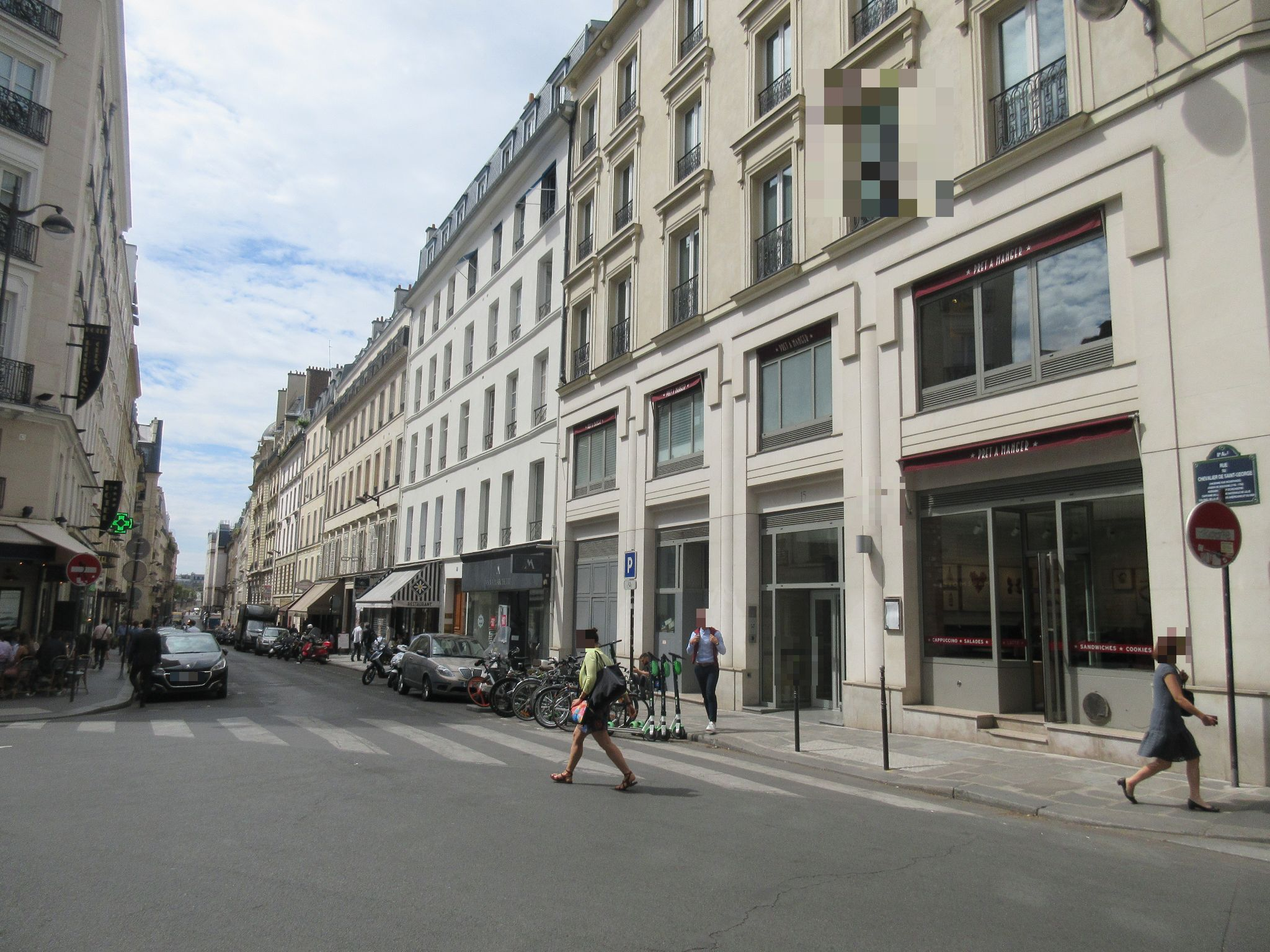
Rue du Chevalier-de-Saint-George is near La Madeleine, Paris

The "Adagio" from Saint-Georges's Violin Concerto in D Major, Op. 3, no. 1 is quoted in the song "Daughter" from Beyoncé's 2024 album, Cowboy Carter. Saint-Georges's life and career was the basis of the 2022 biographical film, Chevalier, with Kelvin Harrison Jr. portraying the composer. Saint-George is also the subject of a short film by the violinist, Quinton Morris.

Dutch-Surinamese filmmaker, composer and musician Orville Breeveld conducted research into the life and work of Chevalier de Saint-Georges between 2003 and 2015. This work culminated in 2023 in the Dutch NTR documentary series Nieuwe Blik Terug ("A New Look Back"), which highlights notable Black figures in European history. The first episode of this six-part series is devoted to Joseph Bologne, Chevalier de Saint-Georges, and is still available to watch online. In addition, Breeveld created a unique Dutch-language podcast series in the Netherlands. In 2021 he produced Gemiste Sterren ("Missed Stars"), a podcast about overlooked Black composers; the first episode focuses on Chevalier de Saint-Georges. A keynote concert under the same title, Nieuwe Blik Terug, also took place at the Royal Concertgebouw in Amsterdam, where Breeveld, together with various international musicians, presented the music and lives of Black composers to a broad audience.

Bologne's modern impact and legacy can be seen through the Festival International de Musique Saint-Georges (English: Saint-Georges International Music Festival), held in Guadeloupe. Co-founded by conductor Marlon Daniel as a 2011 outreach in Bologne's homeland, it was later formalized through the Association Festival International de Musique Saint-Georges in 2016, with Marlon Daniel as its ongoing Artistic and Musical director. The festival had its first full iteration in 2018 and is dedicated to the performance and public interpretation of Bologne's music and historical significance. Its programming situates Bologne within both eighteenth-century European classical music and Guadeloupean cultural memory, combining concerts with conferences, masterclasses and educational events across the archipelago. The festival has also contributed to broader debates about representation in classical music by presenting Bologne as part of a longer Afro-diasporic musical history; in a 2023 account, historian Olivette Otele described its concerts, conferences and masterclasses in Guadeloupe as a means of widening access to classical music and renewing public engagement with Bologne's life and work.

The Festival also supports access to Bologne's musical works by making critical editions of selected scores freely available to performers and researchers.

== Home ==
From 1757, Saint-Georges lived at 49, Rue Saint André des Arts with his parents. In 1774, he lived at Rue Guénégaud (also 6th arrondissement of Paris) with his mother. In 1777, he lived at Rue des Fontaines-du-Temple, in 1778 at Rue Saint Pierre, both in Le Marais; in 1779 he moved to 5, Chaussee d'Antin. After 1785, he lived in the Palais Royal. In September 1789, he stayed at Grenier's in Jermyn Street (Westminster) patronized by French refugees. In 1791, he lived at 550, Rue Notre-Dame, Lille. On 17 May 1793, he appeared as a witness at the Tribunal Révolutionnaire in a case against the Polish general Jozef Miaczinsky and gave his address at Rue des Filles-Saint-Thomas. In March 1796, he lived at rue Jean Fleury (near Saint-Germain l'Auxerrois). In 1799, when he was sick he lived Rue de Chartres-Saint-Honoré across the Palais-Royal but this street disappeared. On 9 June 1799, Saint-Georges died at his friend's Duhemal apartment Rue de Boucherat 13, (Le Marais). He was buried at Cimetière Sainte-Marguerite.

== Works ==
Saint-Georges, influenced by the prevailing sentimental style, wrote twelve violin concertos, two symphonies, and eight symphony-concertantes, a new, intrinsically Parisian genre of which he was one of the chief exponents. He wrote his instrumental works over a short span of time, and they were published between 1771 and 1779. He also wrote six opéras comiques and a number of songs in manuscript. Saint-Georges wrote two more sets of six string quartets, three forte-piano and violin sonatas, a sonata for harp and flute, six violin duets, a rondeau for two violins, an adagio in F-minor (for piano), a harpsichord quartet.

Some of Saint-Georges' music has been lost, including a children's opera, "Aline et Dupré, ou le marchand de marrons", of which only the overture survives. The music for three other known compositions is lost: a cello sonata, performed in Lille in 1792, a concerto for clarinet, and one for bassoon. Some French journalists such as Alain Guédé have asserted without evidence that Saint-Georges' scores were purposefully burned because of his skin color, or even that Napoleon banned his music from being performed. Arguing against this, Banat observes that Saint-Georges' legacy was well-remembered in elite circles, especially his skill in fencing.

=== Operas ===
- Ernestine, opéra comique in 3 acts, libretto by Choderlos de Laclos revised by Desfontaines-Lavallée, première in Paris, Comédie Italienne, 19 July 1777, lost. Note: a few numbers survive.
- La Partie de chasse, opéra comique in 3 acts, libretto by Desfontaines, public premiere in Paris, Comédie Italienne, 12 October 1778, lost. Note: a few numbers survive.
- L'Amant anonyme (The Anonymous Lover), comédie mélée d'ariettes et de ballets, in 2 acts, after a play by Mme. de Genlis, première in Paris, Théâtre de Mme. de Montesson, 8 March 1780, complete manuscript in Paris Bibliothèque Nationale, section musique, côte 4076. In 2016, the opera was revived by American Conductor Marlon Daniel, a leading authority on the life and music of Joseph Bologne, Chevalier de Saint-Georges, and the Artistic and Music Director of the Festival International de Musique Saint-Georges. The performance, which marked the American premiere of the complete work, took place at the Charleston Gaillard Center in South Carolina. This marked the first time the opera had been performed in its entirety, 236 years after it was composed, featuring French soprano Magali Léger in the leading role of Léontine and Cuban-American tenor Everette Shuttle as Valcour, the titular "Anonymous Lover." The edition was prepared from manuscripts by ArtistWorld Publishing. The first critical edition of this, was prepared by Opera Ritrovata for streaming performance by Los Angeles Opera and the Colburn School in November 2020. In June 2022, this work was performed by the Haymarket Opera Company in Chicago. The opera was subsequently recorded by Cedille Records and features the soprano Nicole Cabell.
- La Fille garçon, opéra comique mélée d'ariettes in 2 acts, libretto by Desmaillot, premiere in Paris, Comédie Italienne, 18 August 1787, lost.
- Aline et Dupré, ou le marchand de marrons, children's opera, premiere in le Théâtre du comte de Beaujolais, 1788. lost.
- Guillaume tout coeur ou les amis du village, opéra comique in one act, libretto by Monnet, première in Lille, 8 September 1790, lost.

=== Symphonies ===
- Deux Symphonies à plusieurs instruments, Op. XI No. 1 in G and No. 2 in D. (Note: No 1 is listed as 'spurious' by Grove Music Online. No 2 is identical with the overture to Bologne's opéra comique, L'Amant anonyme. The orchestration consists of strings, two oboes and two horns.)

=== Concertante ===
==== Violin concertos ====
Saint-Georges composed 14 violin concertos. Before copyrights, several publishers issued his concertos with both Opus numbers and numbering them according to the order in which they were composed. The thematic incipits on the right, should clear up the resulting confusion.

- Op. II No. 1 in G and No. 2 in D, published by Bailleux, 1773
- Op. III No. 1 in D and No. 2 in C, Bailleux, 1774
- Op. IV No. 1 in D and No. 2 in D, Bailleux, 1774 (No. 1 also published as "Op. post." while No. 2 is also known simply as "op. 4")
- Op. V No.1 in C and No. 2 in A, Bailleux, 1775
- Op. VII No. 1 in A and No. 2 in B♭, Bailleux, 1777
- Op. VIII No. 1 in D and No. 2 in G, Bailleux n/d (No. 2 issued by Sieber, LeDuc and Henry as No. 9. No. 1 is also known simply as "op. 8")
- Op. XII No. 1 in E♭ and No. 2 in G, Bailleux 1777 (both issued by Sieber as No. 10 and No. 11)

==== Symphonies concertantes ====
- Op. VI No. 1 in C and No. 2 in B♭, Bailleux, 1775
- Op. IX No. 1 in C and No. 2 in A, LeDuc, 1777
- Op. X for two violins and viola, No. 1 in F and No. 2 in A, La Chevardière, 1778
- Op. XIII No. 1 in E♭ and No. 2 in G, Sieber, 1778

Unlike the concertos, their publishers issued the symphonie-concertantes following Bailleux's original opus numbers, as shown by the incipits on the right.

=== Chamber music ===
==== Sonatas ====
- Trois Sonates for keyboard with violin: B♭, A, and G minor, Op. 1a, composed c. 1770, published in 1781 by LeDuc.
- Sonata for harp with flute obligato, n.d.: E♭, original MS in Bibliothèque Nationale, côte: Vm7/6118
- Sonate de clavecin avec violin obligé G major, arrangement of Saint-Georges's violin concerto Op. II No. 1 in G, in the collection Choix de musique du duc regnant des Deux-Ponts
- Six Sonatas for violin accompanied by a second violin: B♭, E♭, A, G, B♭, A: Op. posth. Pleyel, 1800.
- Cello Sonata, lost, mentioned by a review in the Gazette du departement du Nord on 10 April 1792.
- Sonata and Rondo in C Major, edited by Hyunjung Rachel Chung, notes by Hyunjung Rachel Chung, 2024. Licensed under CC BY-NC-ND 4.0. Available at IMSLP.

==== String quartet ====
- Six quatuors à cordes, pour 2 vls, alto & basse, dédiés au prince de Robecq, in C, E♭, G minor, C minor, G minor, & D. Op. 1; probably composed in 1770 or 1771, published by Sieber in 1773.
- Six quartetto concertans "Au gout du jour", no opus number. In B♭, G minor, C, F, G, and B♭, published by Durieu in 1779.
- Six Quatuors concertans, oeuvre XIV, in D, B♭, F minor, G, E♭, & G minor, published by Boyer, 1785.

=== Vocal music ===
Recueil d'airs et duos avec orchestre: stamped Conservatoire de musique #4077, now in the music collection of the Bibliothèque Nationale, contains:

1. Allegro: Loin du soleil, in E♭.
2. Andante: N'êtes vous plus la tendre amie? in F.
3. Ariette: Satisfait du plaisir d'aimer; in A.
4. Ariette-Andante: (Clemengis) La seule Ernestine qui m'enflamme; in E♭
5. Duo: (Isabelle & Dorval) C'est donc ainsi qu'on me soupconne; in F.
6. Scena-Recitavo: Ernestine, que vas tu faire .. as tu bien consulte ton Coeur? in E♭.
7. Aria: O Clemengis, lis dans mon Ame; in C minor.
8. Air: Image cherie, Escrits si touchants; in B♭.
9. Air: Que me fait a moi la richesse ... sans songer a Nicette; in F minor.
10. Duo: Au prés de vous mon Coeur soupire

Note: The names of the characters, Ernestine and Clemengis, in numbers 4, 6, 7 and 8 of the above pieces indicate they came from the opera Ernestine; number 5 is probably from La Partie de chasse.

The orchestra for all the above consists of strings, two oboes and two horns.

Additional songs

- Air: "Il n'est point, disoit mon père", from the opera Ernestine, in Journal de Paris, 1777.
- Two Airs de la Chasse, "Mathurin dessus l'herbette" and "Soir et matin sous la fougère" "de M. de Saint-Georges" in Journal de La Harpe, of 1779, the first air, no. 9, the second one, no. 10, dated 1781, marked: "With accompagnement by M. Hartman", clearly only the voice part may be considered to be by Saint-Georges. The same is true of an air "de M. de St.-George", "L'Autre jour sous l'ombrage", also in the Journal de La Harpe (8e Année, No. 7), marked: "avec accompagnement par M. Delaplanque".
- Two Italian canzonettas: "Sul margine d'un rio" and "Mamma mia" (different than the spurious "Six Italian Canzonettas") copied by an unknown hand (including the signature) but authenticated by a paraphe (initials) in Saint-Georges' hand. They are in BnF, ms 17411.

=== Dubious works ===
The opera, Le Droit du seigneur taken for a work by Saint-Georges is in fact by J-P-E. Martini: one aria contributed by Saint-Georges, mentioned in 1784 by Mercure de France, is lost.

A Symphony in D by "Signor di Giorgio" in the British Library, arranged for pianoforte, as revealed by Prof. Dominique-René de Lerma is by the Earl of Kelly, using a nom de plume.

A quartet for harp and strings, ed. by Sieber, 1777, attributed to Saint-Georges, is mentioned in an advertisement in Mercure de France of September 1778 as: "arranged and dedicated to M. de Saint-Georges" by Delaplanque. This is obviously by the latter.

A sonata in the Recueil Choix de musique in the Bibliothèque Nationale, is a transcription for forte-piano and violin of Saint-Georges' violin concerto in G major, Op. II No. 1. This is the only piece by Saint-Georges in the entire collection erroneously attributed to him.

Recueil d'Airs avec accompagnement de forte piano par M. de St. Georges pour Mme. La Comtesse de Vauban, sometimes presented as a collection of vocal pieces by Saint-Georges, contains too many numbers obviously composed by others. For example, "Richard Coeur de lion" is by Grétry; "Iphigenie en Tauride" is by Gluck; and an aria from Tarare is by Salieri. Even if Saint-Georges had arranged their orchestral accompaniments for forte-piano, it would be wrong to consider them as his compositions. As for the rest, though some might be by Saint-Georges, since this may only be resolved by a subjective stylistic evaluation, it would be incorrect to accept them all as his work.

Six Italian Canzonettas by a Signor di Giorgio, for voice, keyboard or harp, and The Mona Melodies, a collection of ancient airs from the Isle of Man, in the British Library, are not by Saint-Georges.

Recueil de pieces pour forte piano et violon pour Mme. la comtesse de Vauban erroneously subtitled "Trios" (they are solos and duos), a collection of individual movements, some for piano alone, deserves the same doubts as the Recueil d'Airs pour Mme. Vauban. Apart from drafts for two of Saint-Georges's oeuvres de clavecin, too many of these pieces seem incompatible with the composer's style. "Les Caquets" (The Gossips) a violin piece enthusiastically mentioned by some authors as typical of Saint-Georges's style, was composed in 1936 by the violinist Henri Casadesus. He also forged a spurious Handel viola concerto and the charming but equally spurious Adélaïde Concerto supposedly by the ten-year-old Mozart, which Casadesus' brother, Marius Casadesus later admitted having composed (often incorrectly attributed to Henri as well).

== Discography ==
The following is a list of all known commercial recordings.

=== Symphonies concertantes ===
- Symphonie Concertante, Op. IX, No. 1 in C: Miroslav Vilimec and Jiri Zilak, violins, Pilsen Radio Orchestra, Frantisek Preisler, conductor, Avenira, 1996–98.
- Symphonie Concertante, Op. IX, No. 2 in A: Miroslav Vilimec and Jiri Zilak, violins, Pilsen Radio Orchestra, Frantisek Preisler, conductor, Avenira, 1996–98.
- Symphonie Concertante, Op. X, No. 1 in F: Miroslav Vilimec and Jiri Zilak, violins, Jan Motlik, viola, Frantisek Preisler, conductor. Avenira, 1996–98.
- Symphonie Concertante, Op. X, No. 2 in A: Miroslav Vilimec and Jiri Zilak, violins, Jan Motlik, viola, Frantisek Preisler, conductor. Avenira, 1996–98.
- Symphonies Concertante, Op. 9, and 10 (with Symphony in G, Op. 11 no. 1): Yury Revich & Libor Jezek, violins; Pavla Honsova, viola. Czech Chamber Philharmonic Orchestra Pardubice; Michael Halasz, conductor. Naxos, 2021.
- Symphonie Concertante, Op. XII (sic) in E♭: Miroslav Vilimec and Jiri Zilak, violins, Pilsen Radio Orchestra, Frantisek Preisler, conductor. Avenira, 1996–98.
- Symphonie Concertante, Op. XIII in G:
  - Miriam Fried and Jaime Laredo, violins, London Symphony Orchestra, Paul Freeman conductor, Columbia Records, 1970.
  - Vilimec and Ailak, violins, Pilsen Radio Orchestra, Preisler conductor, Avenira 1996–98.
  - Christopher Guiot and Laurent Philippe, violins, with Les Archets de Paris. ARCH, 2000.
  - Micheline Blanchard and Germaine Raymond, violins, Ensemble Instrumental Jean-Marie Leclair, Jean-François Paillard, conductor, Erato.
  - Huguette Fernandez and Ginette Carles, violins, Orchestre de Chambre Jean-François Paillard, Paillard, conductor, Musical Heritage Society.
  - Malcolm Lathem and Martin Jones, violins, Concertante of St. James, London, Nicholas Jackson, conductor, RCA Victor, LBS-4945.

=== Symphonies ===
Symphony Op. XI No. 1 in G:

- Orchestre de chambre de Versailles, Fernard Wahl, conductor, Arion, 1981.
- Tafelmusik orchestra, Jeanne Lamon violinist-conductor, Assai M, 2004.
- Le Parlement de musique, Martin Gester conductor, Assai M, 2004.
- Ensemble Instrumental Jean-Marie Leclair, Jean-François Paillard, conductor, Erato n.d., Contemporains Français de Mozart.
- London Symphony Orchestra, Paul Freeman, conductor, Columbia Records, 1974.
- L'Amant anonyme, overture in three movements:
  Tafelmusik Baroque Orchestra, Jeanne Lamon, Conductor, Assai M, 2004
- L'Amant anonyme, contredanse:
  Tafelmusik Baroque Orchestra, Jeanne Lamon, Conductor, Assai M, 2004
- L'Amant anonyme, Ballet No. 1 and No. 6:
  Tafelmusik Baroque Orchestra, Jeanne Lamon, Conductor, Assai M, 2004

Symphony Op. XI No. 2 in D:

- L'Ensemble Instrumental Jean-Marie Leclair, Jean-François Paillard, conductor. Erato, n.d., Contemporains Français de Mozart.
- Orchestre de chambre de Versailles, Bernard Wahl, conductor, Arion, 1981.
- Les Archets de Paris, Christopher Guiot conductor, Archets, 2000.
- Tafelmusik orchestra, Jeanne Lamon, violinist-conductor, Assai M, 2004.
- Le Parlement de musique, Martin Gester, conductor, Assai M, 2004.

=== Violin concertos ===
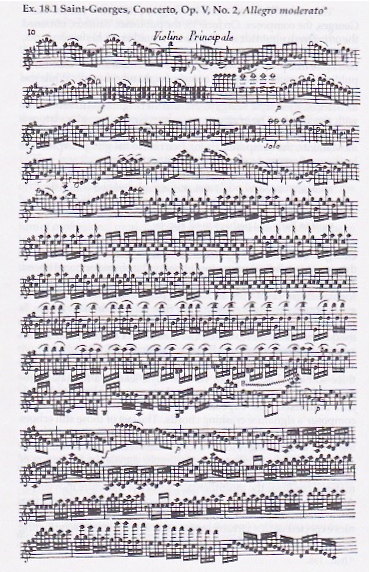
Page from Concerto Op. V No. 2 by Saint-Georges, with Batteries and Bariolages (Rapid alternation between two strings, and arpeggios in high positions?

- Concerto Op. II, No. 1 in G:
  - Miroslav Vilimec, Pilsen Radio Orchestra, Frantisek Preisler conductor, Avenira, 2000.
- Concerto Op. II, No. 2 in D:
  - Miroslav Vilimec, Pilsen Radio Orchestra, Frantisek Preisler, conductor, Avenira, 2000.
  - Stéphanie-Marie Degrand, Le Parlement de musique, Gester, conductor, Assai, 2004.
  - Yura Lee, Bayerische Kammerphilharmonie, Reinhard Goebel Conductor, OEHMS Classics, 2007
- Concerto Op. III, No. 1 in D:
  - Jean-Jacques Kantorow, Orchestre de chambre Bernard Thomas, Arion, 1974.
  - Miroslav Vilimec, Pilsen Radio Orchestra, Frantisek Preisler, conductor, Avenira, 2000.
  - Linda Melsted, Tafelmusik Orchestra, Jeanne Lamon, violinist-conductor, CBC Records, 2003.
  - Qian Zhou, Toronto Camerata, Kevin Mallon, conductor, Naxos, 2004.
- Concerto Op. III, No. 2 in C:
  - Tamás Major, Orchestra della Svizzera Italiana, Forlane, 1999.
  - Miroslav Vilimec, Pilsen Radio Orchestra, Frantisek Preisler, conductor, Avenira, 2000.
- Concerto Op. IV, No. 1 in D:
  - Miroslav Vilimec, Pilsen Radio Orchestra, Frantisek Preisler, conductor, Avenira 2000.
  - Qian Zhou, Camerata Toronto, Kevin Mallon, conductor, Naxos, 2004. (The recording of this concerto was mistakenly reissued by Artaria as Op. posthumus, see incipit of concerto Op. IV, No. 1 in D, in "Works".)
- Concerto Op. IV, No. 2 in D:
  - Hana Kotková, Orchestra della Svizzera Italiiana, Forlane, 1999.
- Concerto Op. V, No. 1 in C:
  - Jean-Jacques Kantorow, Orchestre de chambre Bernard Thomas, Arion, 1974
  - Miroslav Vilimec, Pilsen Radio Orchestra, Frantisek Preisler, conductor, Avenira, 2000.
  - Christoph Guiot, Les Archets de Paris, ARCH, 2000
  - Takako Nishizaki, Köln Kammerorchester, Helmut Müller-Brühl, conductor, Naxos, 2001.
- Concerto Op. V No. 2 in A:
  - Jean-Jacques Kantorow, Orchestre de chambre Bernard Thomas, Arion, 1974
  - Rachel Barton, Encore Chamber Orchestra, Daniel Hegge, conductor, Cedille, 1997.
  - Miroslav Vilimec, Pilsen Radio Orchestra, Frantisek Preisler, conductor, Avenira, 2000.
  - Takako Nishizaki, Köln Kammerorchester, Helmut Müller-Brühl, conductor, Naxos, 2001.
  - Anne-Sophie Mutter, Mutter's Virtuosi, Anne-Sophie Mutter, conductor, Deutsche Grammophon, 2023.
- Concerto Op. VII No. 1 in A: Anthony Flint, Orchestra della Svizzera Italiana, Forlane, 1999.
- Concerto Op. VII No. 2 in B♭:
  - Miroslav Vilimec, Pilsen Radio Orchestra, Frantisek Preisler, conductor, Avenira, 2000.
  - Hans Liviabella, Orchestra della Svizzera Italiana, Alain Lombard, conductor, Forlane, 1999.
- Concerto Op. VII, No. 1, actually Op. XII, No. 1: in D: Anne–Claude Villars, L'Orchestre de chambre de Versailles, Bernard Wahl, conductor, Arion, 1981.
- concerto Op. VII, No. 2, actually Op. XII, No. 2 in G: Anne–Claude Villars, L'Orchestre de chambre de Versailles, Bernard Wahl, conductor, Arion, 1981.
- Concerto Op. VIII, No. 1 in D:
  - Miroslav Vilimec, Pilsen Radio Orchestra, Frantisek Preisler, conductor, Avenira, 2000.
- Concerto Op. VIII, No. 9, actually Op. VIII, No. 2 in G:
  - Jean-Jacques Kantorow, Orchestre de chambre Bernard Thomas, Arion, 1976, Koch, 1996.
  - Takako Nishizaki, Köln Kammerorchester, Helmut Müller-Brühl, conductor, Naxos, 2001.
  - Stéphanie-Marie Degand, Le Parlement de musique, Martin Gester, conductor, Assai M, 2004.
  - Miroslav Vilimec, Pilsen Radio Orchestra, Frantisek Preisler, conductor. Avenira, 2000.
- Concerto Op. VIII, No. 10, actually Op. XII, No. 1 in D: Miroslav Vilimec, Pilsen Radio Orchestra, Frantisek Preisler, conductor. Avenira, 2000.
- Concerto Op. VIII, No. 11, actually Op. XII, No. 2 in G:
  - Miroslav Vilimec, Pilsen Radio Orchestra, Frantisek Preisler, conductor. Avenira, 2000.
  - Qian Zhou, Toronto Camerata, Kevin Mallon, conductor. Naxos 2004. (Listed as Concerto No. 10 in G in the recent Artaria Edition) The Largo of this recording is identical with that of Op. V, No. 2 in A.

=== Chamber music ===
String Quartets:

Six quartets Op. 1 (1771).

- Juilliard Quartet, Columbia Records, 1974.
- Antarés, B♭ only Integral, 2003.
- Coleridge, AFKA, 1998.
- Jean-Noël Molard, Arion 1995.

Six Quatuors Concertans, "Au gout du jour", no opus number (1779).

- Coleridge Quartet, AFKA, 2003.
- Antarés, Integral 2003.
- Arabella String Quartet, Naxos, 2022.

Six Quartets Op. 14 (1785).

- Quatuor Apollon, Avenira, 2005.
- Joachim Quartet, Koch Schwann 1996.
- Quatuor Les Adieux, Auvidis Valois, 1996.
- Quatuor Atlantis, Assai, M 2004.
- Quatuor Apollon, Avenira, 2005

Three keyboard and violin sonatas (Op. 1a):

- J. J. Kantorow, violin, Brigitte Haudebourg, Clavecin, Arion 1979.
- Stéphanie-Marie Degand, Violin, Alice Zylberach, piano, Assai M, 2004.

Collection of pieces for the Comtesse de Vauban (WoO):

- Janise White, harpsichord, Janise White, 2021.

Complete piano sonatas (WoO):

- Mylène Alexis-Garel, piano, Passavant, 2025.

Complete works for keyboard and violin

- Jens Barnieck, piano and Jeanette Pitkevica, violin, Coviello Classics, 2025.

=== Miscellaneous ===
- Adagio in F minor, edited by de Lerma, performance notes by Natalie Hinderas, Orion, 1977.
- Air d'Ernestine: Faye Robinson, soprano, London Symphony Orchestra, Paul Freeman conductor, Columbia Records, 1970.
- L'amant anoynyme, world premiere recording of complete opera. Haymarket Opera Company, conducted by Craig Trompeter. Cedille Records, 2023.
  - Overture and two Airs of Leontine from L'Amant anonyme: Enfin, une foule importune: Du tendre amour: Odile Rhino, soprano, Les Archets de Paris, Christophe Guiot conductor, Archives Records, 2000.
  - Excerpts from Ballets No. 1 & 2, and Contredance from L'Amant anonyme, Tafelmusik Orchestra, Jeanne Lamon, violinist-conductor, CBC Records, 2003.
