= Roger de Beauvoir =

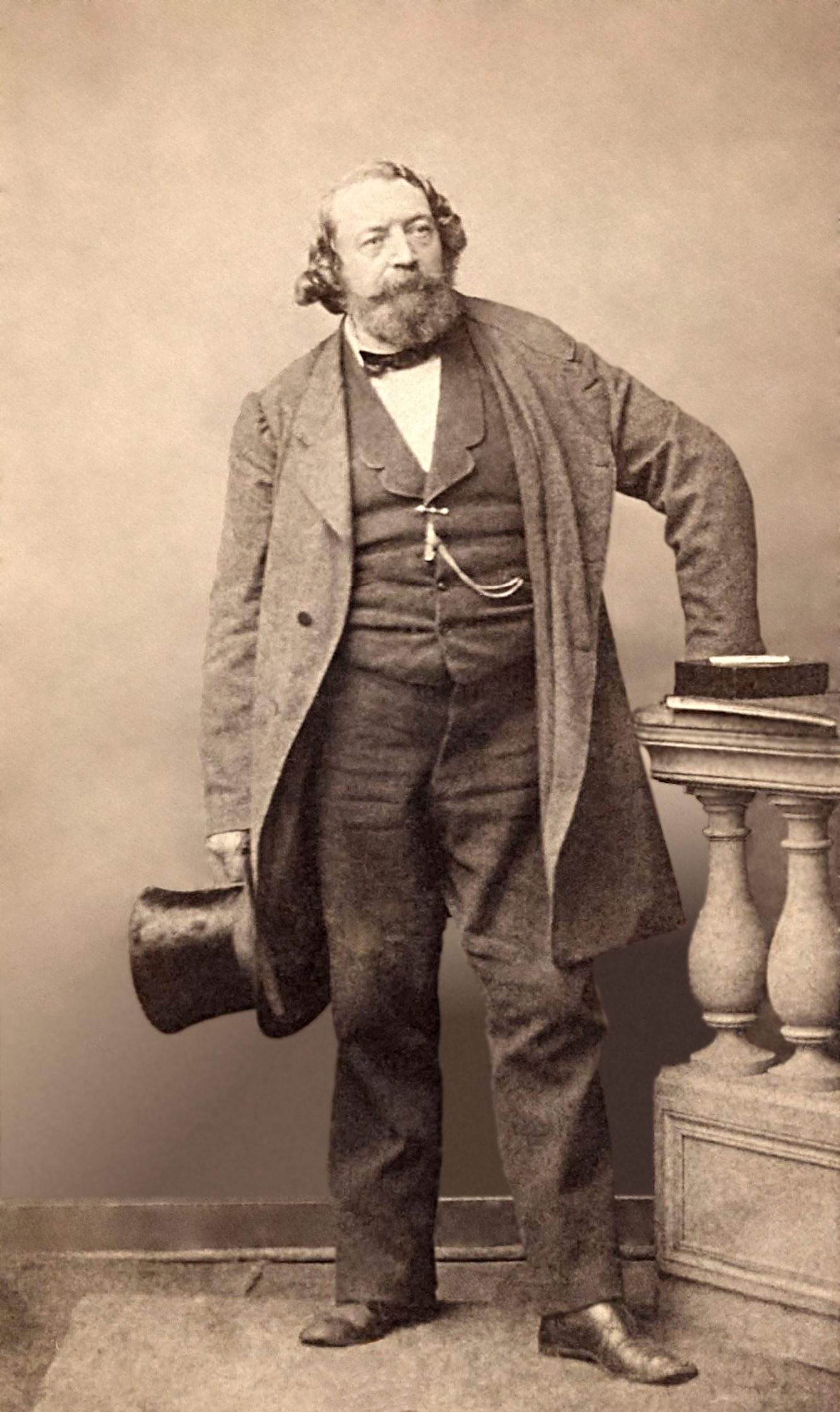
- Born: Eugène Augustin Nicolas Roger; 8 November 1806; Paris, France
- Died: 27 August 1866 (aged 59); Paris, France
- Occupation: writer
- Spouse: Léocadie Doze

Roger de Beauvoir (8 November 1806 – 27 August 1866) was the pen name of French Romantic novelist and playwright Eugène Augustin Nicolas Roger.

== Life ==
His wit, good-looks and adventurous lifestyle made him well known in Paris, where he was a friend of Alexandre Dumas, père. Of independent means, he wed actress and author Léocadie Doze in 1847. He was imprisoned for three months and fined 500 francs for a satirical poem, Mon Procs, written in 1849. Afflicted with gout and nearly destitute from his flamboyant lifestyle, he spent the last few years of his life unhappily confined to a chair, dying in Paris.

His best-known works included Le Chevalier de Saint-Georges (1840), Les Oeufs de Paques (1856) and Le Pauvre Diable (reprinted 1871).

== Bibliography ==
- La Cape et l'Épée
- Histoires cavalières - La Lescombat: Le Moulin D'heilly. David Dick (1834). Les Eaux Des Pyrénées. Mademoiselle De Sens
- Duels et duellistes
- Le Chevalier de Saint-Georges (novel and play)
- L'Écolier de Cluny
- Les Soirs au Lido
- Les Oeufs de Paques
- Le Café Procope
- L'Auberge des Trois Pins
- Les Soupeurs de mon temps
- La Lescombat
- Les Aventurieres
- Le Pauvre Diable
- Colombes et couleuvres, etc.
