= Louise Fusil =

French actress and memoirist (died 1848)

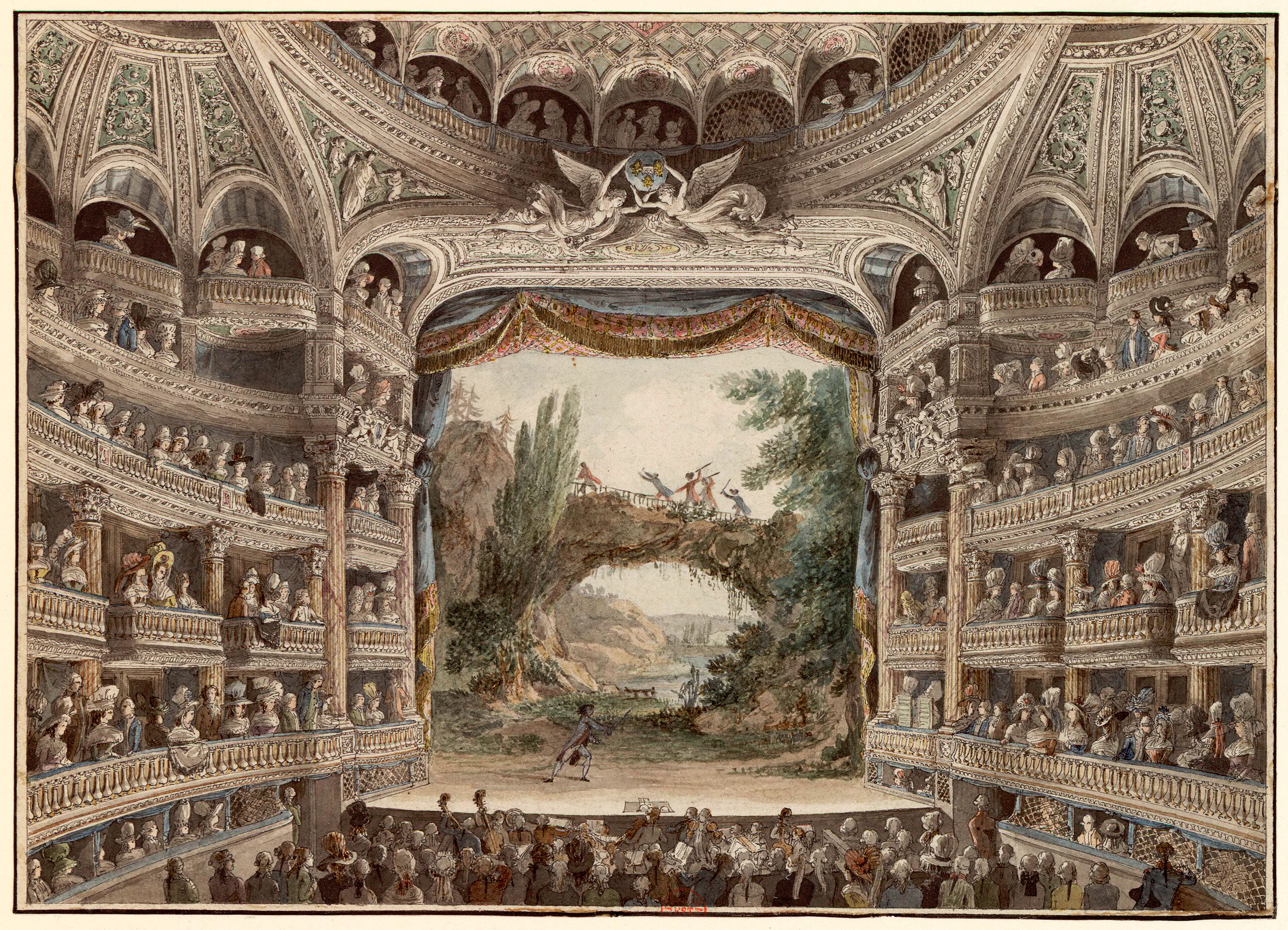
Paris Comedie-Francaise (1790)

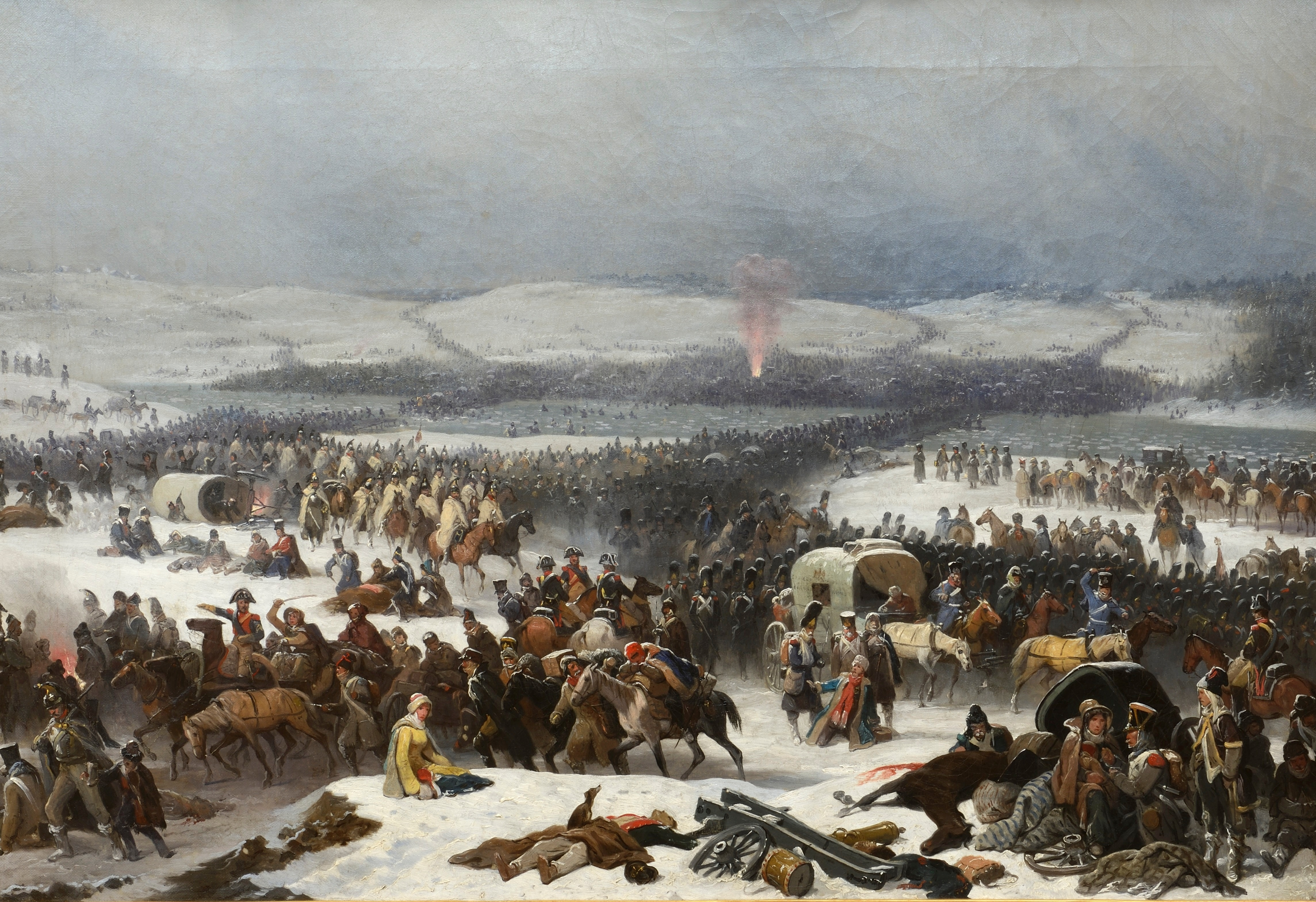
Berezyna

Fusil - Souvenirs d'une actrice

Louise Fusil (née Louise Liard; 1765, 1771, or 1774 – 1848) was a French stage actress, singer and memoir writer, describing her life, travelling, and giving ethnographical details. These memoires are a pleasant read and of real interest, despite serious factual and chronological errors. The work constitutes a prime document for the study of the lifestyle of actors at the end of the eighteenth century.

== Life ==
Louise was born in Dresden into a family of travelling actors, and married the actor Claude Fusil in Toulouse with whom she had a daughter. After she divorced in Lyon she made a solo career as a singer and actress. She was a pupil of Niccolò Piccinni and performed popular classical tragedies at the Theatre des Beaujolais and Salle Richelieu. She notes the influence of the French revolution on new literary trends, the return to antiquity and the idealization of the heroes of the Roman Republic.

She was friendly with the actor Julie Talma, cooperated with Chevalier de Saint-Georges. Together with the horn virtuoso Lamothe, and Saint-George she went on a brief concert tour to Amiens and Tournai. Fusil gives details about her life in the Austrian Netherlands during the Reign of Terror. In 1793 she met with Joseph Le Bon, who had her imprisoned. She performed with Marie-Joseph Chénier at the Festival of the Supreme Being.

She was living in Russia for six years. She gave details in her memoirs about the people she met in salons in Saint Petersburg and Moscow. She witnessed the fire of Moscow (1812), gave details on the looting French soldiers, Fyodor Rostopchin and Armand de Caulaincourt, and performed before Napoleon during the French occupation. Fusil returned with the suffering French army in October 1812. She described the cold weather, the fate of people and horses, the attacks of the Cossacks and the battle of Krasnoi, where she picked up a child left by its mother twice. She travelled with general François Joseph Lefebvre and describes the crossing of the Berezina in Marshal Louis-Alexandre Berthier's carriage and her arrival in Vilna where she met again with Kutuzov and Alexander I of Russia.

She then travelled to Finland and Sweden and met with Madame de Stael who also corresponded with Kutuzov. In 1833 she visited Sweden again. Between 1844 and 1848, she edited a fashion and literary periodical,"Revue des dames" which did not receive the same success according to her memoirs. At the end of her life she lived in a hospice and died in Montmartre.

== Source ==
- Fusil, Louise (1841). Souvenirs d'une actrice (in French). Paris: Charles Schmit.
- Banat, Gabriel (2006). The Chevalier de Saint-Georges: Virtuoso of the Sword and the Bow. Hillsdale, New York: Pendragon Press. ISBN 978-1-57647-109-8. OCLC 63703876.
