= Free Legion of Americans and the South (French Army) =

French Army volunteer unit of the Revolution

Hussars of Saint George Free Legion of Americans Free Legion of Americans and the South
- Active: 6 December 1792 – 5 March 1794
- Country: First French Republic
- Branch: French Revolutionary Army
- Type: Light cavalry and Chasseurs
- Size: Regiment of four squadrons
- Part of: Army of the North
- Engagements: French Revolutionary Wars

Commanders
- Notable commanders: Chevalier de Saint-Georges; Thomas-Alexandre Dumas

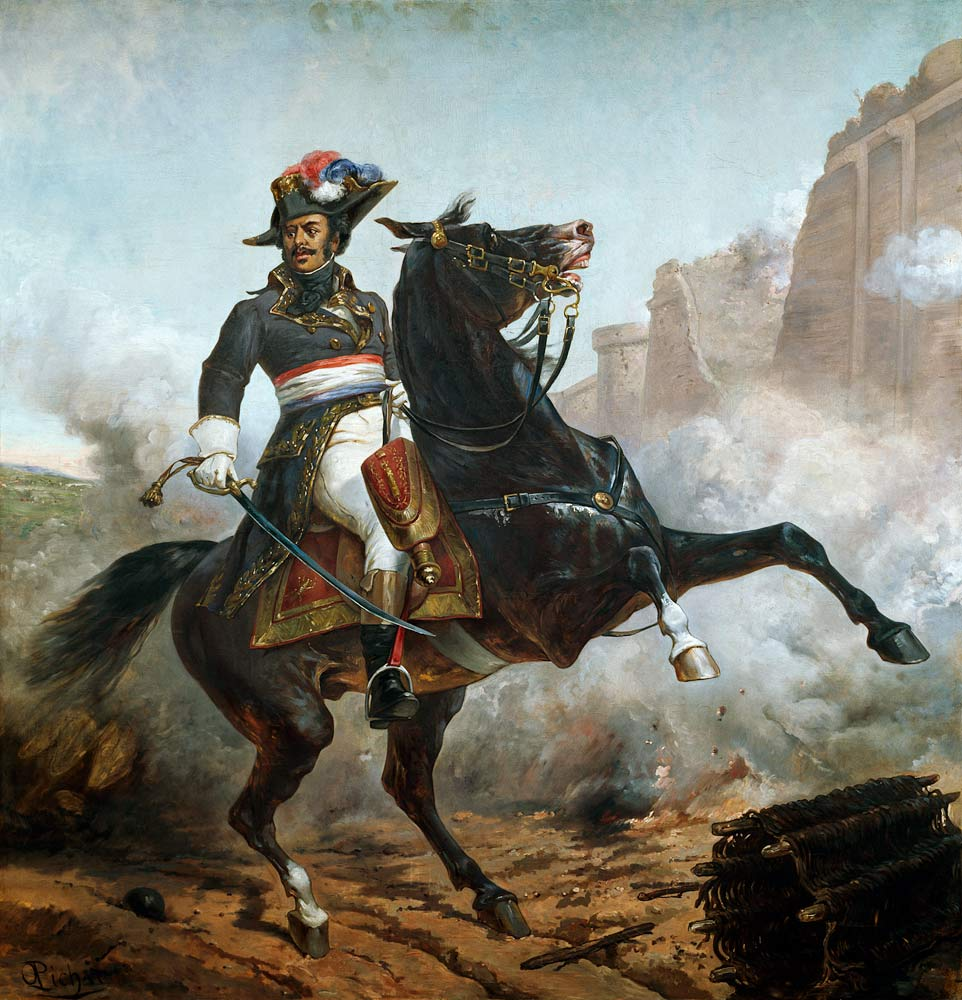
Thomas Alexandre Dumas, officer in the Legion, idealized painting by Olivier Pichat

The Free Legion of Americans and the South (French: Légion Franche des Américains et du Midi) (also known as the American Legion (French: Légion Américaine), the Légion Noire and the Légion de Saint-Georges) was a short-lived military legion of National Volunteers formed in December 1792 during the French Revolution and disbanded in March 1795.

The legion was notable for being composed entirely of free men of colour of both mixed-race and black heritage.

== History ==
On September 7, 1792, Julien Raimond, leader of a delegation of free men of color from Saint-Domingue (Haiti), petitioned the National Assembly to authorize the formation of a Legion of volunteers. The next day, the Parliament established a light cavalry in Lille consisting of volunteers from the French West Indies and Le Midi. The name of it was "Légion franche de cavalerie des Américains et du Midi"; after 7 December it was referred to as "American Legion" and "Légion de Saint-George", attached to the Army of the North (France). In February 1793, lacking infantry, the American Legion changed its name and became "13e régiment de chasseurs à cheval".

=== Formation ===
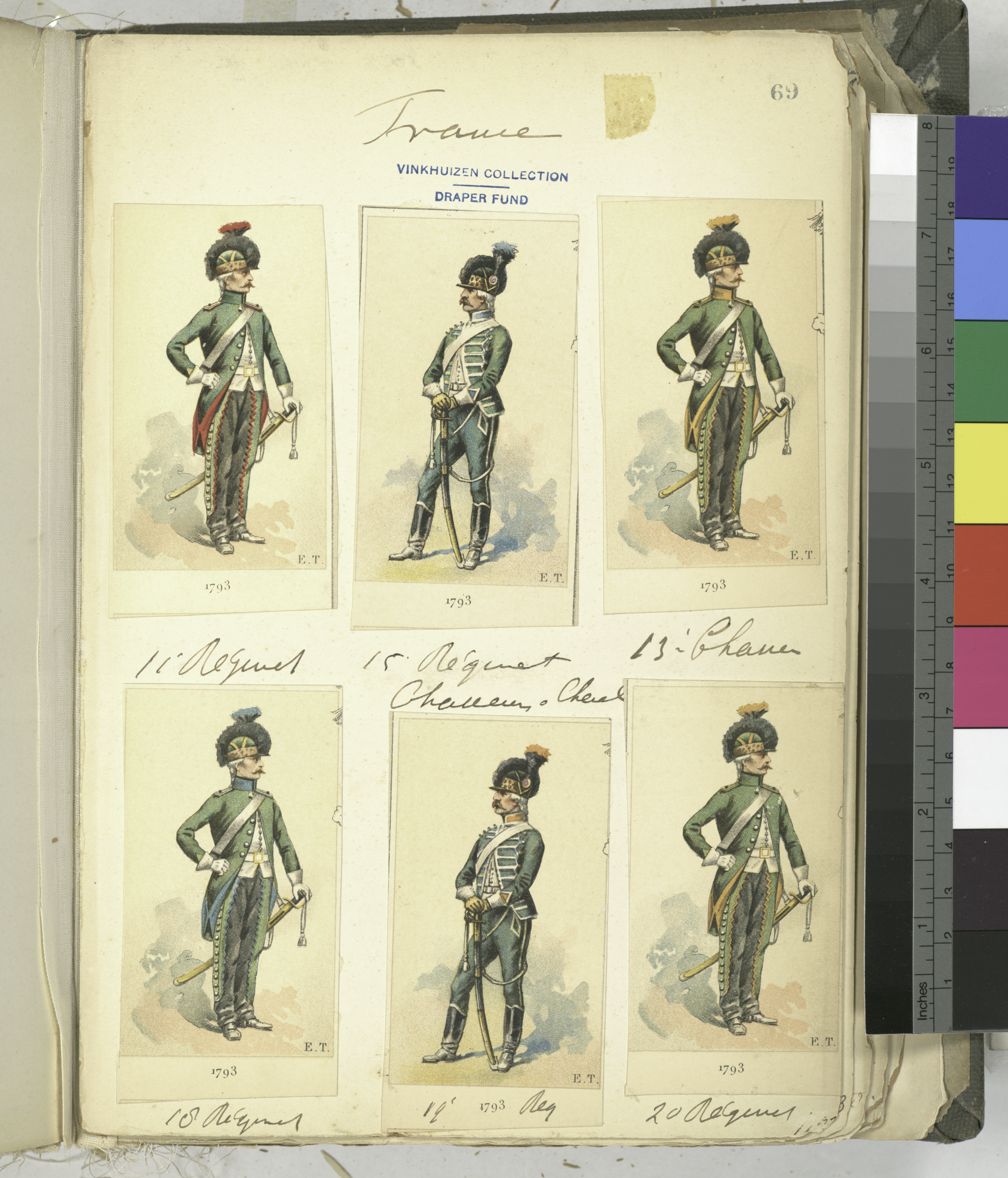
Uniforms of several chasseur regiments in 1793. The 13th can be seen the top right corner.

Following the upheaval of the French Revolution, a delegation of free coloured men presented a petition to the National Assembly in Paris asking for permission to raise several free companies for service to the Republic. On 7 September 1792, the assembly passed a decree calling for the formation of the new Free Legion of Americans of the South ("Americans" referring to the French Antilles, Lesser Antilles or Windward Islands France’s American colonies, and "Le Midi" referring to the South of France. The new unit quickly became known simply as the "Free American Legion", but the official title was used on all correspondence. By the beginning of November, the legion comprised 200 chevaliers mounted on horses in two companies (Compagnies à Cheval) and 800 dismounted chasseurs (hunters) on foot organised into eight companies (Compagnies à Pied/des Chasseurs). The legion formed up under command of the (biracial) colonel Joseph Bologne, Chevalier de Saint-Georges, who was born on the island Guadeloupe as the son of a planter and an enslaved woman.

According to the formation decree, the legion would comprise four mounted squadrons, each of two companies, of which each comprises the following: 1 × chief sergeant major, 2 × sub-sergeant majors, 1 × brigadier-quartermaster, 4 × brigadiers (equivalent to corporals), 4 × "appointés", 72 × chasseurs, 1 × trumpeter, all commanded by 1 × captain, 1 × lieutenant, and 1 × second-lieutenant. The regiment staff then comprised the following: 1 × colonel, 2 × lieutenant colonels, 1 × regimental quartermaster, 1 × regimental chaplain, 1 × surgeon-major, 2 × adjutants, and 1 each of the following: trumpet major, marshal, saddler, gunsmith, tailor, and shoemaker. This structure would leave the regiment with a total of 724 officers, non-commissioned officers, and troops.

On 7 November, the legion, now comprising 400 chasseurs on foot and 150 chevaliers on horseback, left Paris for Amiens near the French Frontier. A decree of 6 December reorganises the legion, initially as a mixed body of infantry and cavalry, into a cavalry unit completely mounted on horses. The legion now became known as the Free Legion of American Horse (French: Légion Franche à Cheval des Americans) and consequently taken under the direct control of the French Army as 13th in precedence. Rather unusually, because of recruiting difficulties, by this point the legion only comprised seven companies, of which only one was made up of coloured men, while the remainder comprised European-whites. Initially the legion lacked horses.

=== Background ===
By 1793, the number of light cavalry regiments of the French Army had more than doubled their total of 1789, while the number of medium and heavy regiments had increased by a paltry four. The fact that the chasseurs à cheval regiments should now number 26 against a bare 12, four years previously, is highly indicative of the state of the army as a whole; the role of light cavalry involved reconnaissance and the screening of the main army, leaving the body blows to the more professional heavy cavalry, and they were thus far more easily raised and trained. The chasseurs, being the indigenous French light horse, can perhaps therefore be equated best with the infantry demi-brigades of this period, a half-trained, unprofessional, makeshift collection, making up with zeal what they lacked in experience.

=== Service ===
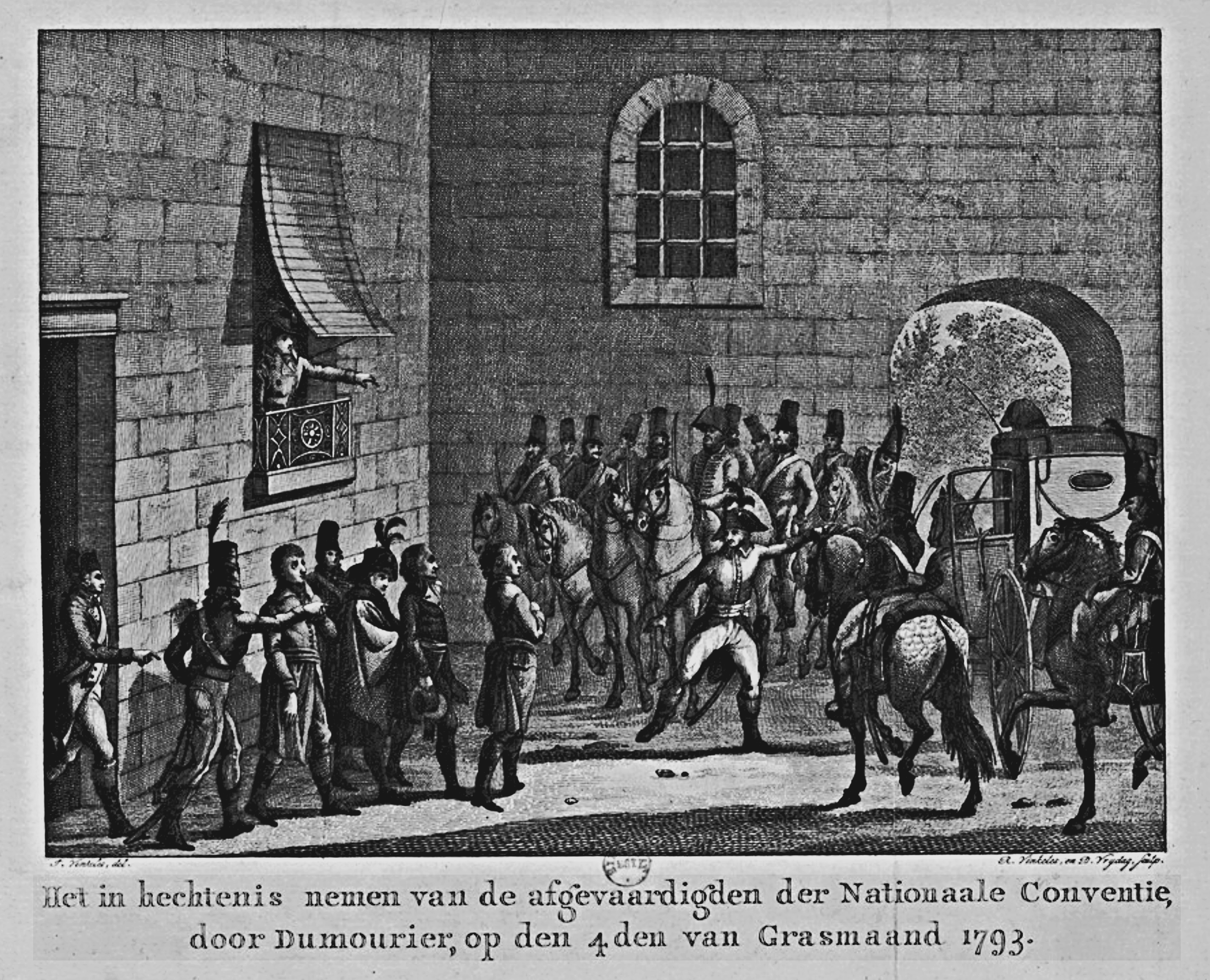
Dumouriez sending the arrested commissioners to Tournai on 3 April 1793; print by Reinier Vinkeles

By February 1793, the legion arrived in Laon (coming from Château-Thierry?) to obtain more horses, and quickly transferred to Lille by 21 February, where it had to completely re-equip as it became a cavalry unit. On 25 February 1793, a report by General Nicolas Joseph Bécourt to the Ministry of Defence reported the regiment having just five officers present with the remainder "having fun in Paris", and reporting the companies without commanding officers. By the time that the regiment was completely reorganised and its discipline restored, it was commonly known as Saint George's Hussars or (French: Hussards de Saint-Georges).

By 5 March 1793, the regiment saw service, participating in several skirmishes during the Flanders campaign, and on this date arrived in Bruges. At the time of General Charles François Dumouriez's betrayal, the Army of the North was near collapse but the regiment succeeded to avoid an occupation of Lille by General Jozef Miaczinsky's troops. Because of the regiment's closeness to the two former generals, several officers were arrested in September as suspects aiding in the escape of Dumouriez, including the Chevalier of Saint-George along with ten other officers. These officers would not be freed until the Thermidorian Reaction, more than a year and a half later. By this time, the later famed General Thomas Alexandre Davy de La Pailleterioe de Dumas took command of the regiment after the dismissal of Saint George. At the end of April 1795 (?), 73 men from the Légion Saint-Georges were sent to Guadeloupe via Brest as police enforcement (gendarmerie).

=== Merger ===
Following several years of horse supply issues, the government decided to completely reorganise the cavalry corps. As a result of the reorganisations, a decree dated 20 January 1793 saw the entire cavalry corps have its structure fixed at 2 carabiniers, 27 cavalry regiments, 20 dragoons, 23 chasseurs, and 11 hussars. The Convention provided the French Army with a total of 97,600 horsemen. However, the decree which eliminated corps of troops raised by popular societies in the past and for the future was never fully executed, especially with respect to the effectives.

On 26 Nivôse Year III (29 January 1793), the regiment was amalgamated with several other volunteer units: Dragoons of the Manche (English Channel), Dragoons of Seine-Inférieure, Dragoons of Calvados, and the cavalry companies of the Polish and Batavian Legion (Dutch) to form the new 13th Light Horse Regiment (French: 13ème Régiment de Chasseurs à Cheval).

== Uniform ==
The uniform of the legion was as follows: green coats and breeches with white trim; a hussar dolman was worn; together with the infantry-style crested helmet. This helmet was then replaced with the winged cap or replaced with the mirliton in orange, edged in the button colour. The hussar costume was in dark green and white was retained (belts were white), but without the pelisse. Weapons were the curved, hussar-pattern light cavalry sabre with a brass hilt, and a Year 1779 cavalry carbine, along with a brace of cavalry pistols. Collars, cuffs, and edging were orange, while the collar piping was in green.

== Sources ==
- Detaille, Edouard (1889). L'Armée Française – Types et Uniformes (in French). Asnières-sur-Seine, France: Valadon & Companige.
- Smith, Digby (2000). Napoleon's Regiments: Battle Histories of the Regiments of the French Army, 1792–1815. London, United Kingdom: Greenhill Books. ISBN 978-1853674136. OCLC 43787649.
- Bukhari, Emir (1977). Napoleon's Line Chasseurs. Men-at-Arms Series. London, United Kingdom: Osprey Publishing. ISBN 978-0850452693. OCLC 611011017.
- Smith, Digby (2015). An Illustrated Encyclopedia of Uniforms of The Napoleonic Wars: An Expert, In-depth Reference to the Officers and Soldiers of the Revolutionary And Napoleonic Period, 1792–1815 (PDF). London, United Kingdom: Lorenz Publishing. ISBN 978-0754815716. OCLC 60320422.
