= Quinton Morris (violinist) =

American violinist (born 1977)

Quinton Morris (born September 7, 1977) is an American violinist, educator, filmmaker, and the creator and host of the multimedia series Unmute The Voices.

== Early life and education ==
Morris was born in Springfield, Illinois, on September 7, 1977. He was raised in Park Forest, before moving with his mother and brother to Renton, Washington in November 1992. He began playing the violin at age 8 in the Park Forest public schools; as a teenager he studied with Walter Schwede, the former associate concertmaster of the Seattle Symphony and professor of violin at the University of Washington and Western Washington University. He graduated from Renton High School in 1996.

He studied at Xavier University of Louisiana with the intention to study law, but was encouraged by his violin teacher, Rachel Jordan, to pursue music more seriously. Thereafter, he transferred to the University of North Carolina School of the Arts, where he earned his bachelor of music degree. While there, he founded the Young Eight, a string octet of Black musicians who toured the United States from 2002 until 2012 with Morris as artistic director.

Morris earned a master of music degree from the Boston Conservatory at Berklee, where he studied violin with Lynn Chang and chamber music with Irina Muresanu. He earned a Doctor of Musical Arts degree from the Butler School of Music at the University of Texas at Austin, where he studied with Daniel Ching, first violinist of the Miro Quartet.

== Performance career ==
Morris performed sold-out recitals in the Weill Recital Hall at Carnegie Hall for three consecutive seasons. He made his debut with soprano Indra Thomas and pianist Maimy Fong in January 2011, presented a solo recital with pianist Erin Chung the following year, and in 2014 appeared with pianist Alastair Edmonstone and hornist David Jolley.

Morris has toured internationally. He has appeared as a concerto soloist with the Seattle Symphony, Seattle Metropolitan Chamber Orchestra, Tacoma Youth Symphony, Thalia Symphony, Harmonia Orchestra, Everett Philharmonic, and presented solo and chamber music recitals with numerous venues around the world.

== Teaching career ==
Morris joined the faculty of the performing arts and arts leadership department, with a joint appointment with the African and African-American studies at Seattle University in 2007. In 2014, he became the second living Black violinist in the United States ever to receive the rank of academic tenure and promotion. In September 2023, he became a full professor, marking the first Black man in the college of arts and sciences to receive such distinction. In May 2025, the university named him one of its first four endowed Loyola Professors at Seattle University.

Morris has presented various masterclasses teaching violin, chamber music, and business entrepreneurship around the world.

== Media career ==
=== Film ===
From 2015 to 2017, Morris toured internationally to perform as recitalist and soloist, as well as to give public lectures, masterclasses, and engage in community outreach. The tour also included screenings of a self-produced short film based on the life and music of 18th-century French composer and violinist, Chevalier de Saint-Georges.

Breakthrough was screened at the Seattle Art Museum and Les Arts décoratifs, among others locations.

=== Radio and video ===
In 2020, Morris became the first ever scholar-in-residence at KING-FM, where he hosts a monthly show called Unmute The Voices, which promotes classical musicians from non-European backgrounds. In 2021, he started a YouTube series with the same name, wherein he interviews musicians and community leaders about their careers.

== Social work ==
Based on his experiences in the Breakthrough tour and personal hardships during his youth, Morris founded the Key to Change violin and viola studio in 2017. Its goal is to provide low-income students in King County with affordable musical instruction that integrates development of social skills. As of 2025, Morris continues to serve as the organization's executive director.

Morris's students have performed with the Seattle Symphony, Northwest Symphony, Seattle Philharmonic Orchestra, Federal Way Symphony Orchestra, University of Washington Philharmonia, and the Tacoma Community College Chamber Orchestra. Additionally, his students have performed for Jill Biden, the First Lady of the United States, and Vice President Kamala Harris.

Morris was appointed to the Seattle Arts Commission in 2017 and went on to serve as its co-chair between 2020 and 2021. From 2024–2026 he served as a fellow at Seattle's historic Rainier Club. In 2013, he delivered a TEDxSeattle talk titled "The Age of the Artist Entrepreneur".

== Reception ==
Morris has earned a number of awards, including the Pathfinder Award from the Puget Sound Association of Phi Beta Kappa, Seattle University Provost Award for Excellence in Scholarship & Creative Endeavors, a Distinguished Alumni Award from the Boston Conservatory at Berklee, the Ibla International Competition's Distinguished Awards, the Washington State Governor's Arts Award, the Seattle Mayor's Arts Award, and the Puget Sound Business Journal's 40 Under 40 award. In January 2024, Seattle Magazine recognized him as a "Most Influential Educator".

== Personal life ==
Morris' cousin was Sonya Massey. He had previously been diagnosed with Hodgkin lymphoma, but was later able to treat it into remission.
