= Louis Héron =

French revolutionary (1746-1796)

François Louis Julien Simon Héron (1746-1796) was a French revolutionary and an agent of the Committee of General Security.

== Biography ==
Louis Heron was the son of Jean Heron (a tobacco farmer) and Judith Costar. He married Modeste-Anne-Jeanne Desbois, daughter of Étienne-Benoist Desbois and Modeste-Charlotte Helvant, on August 12, 1777 in Cancale.

He became quartermaster to the Count of Artois before serving as a naval officer from 1778 to 1784.

Lieutenant of the Sartine in 1782 (owned by Joseph-Denis Goguet, shipowner in La Rochelle), he sailed in May 1784 to Havana, with the mission of buying a million piastres on behalf of Minister Calonne, this million corresponding to the debt of one million piastres owed by the Spanish government to Cabarrus and Lalanne of Madrid in September 1782.

When he got back to France after the seven-month trip, the minister refused to grant him the compensation to which he thought he was entitled.

During the French Revolution, he befriended Jean-Paul Marat and participated in some of its most defining events, including the Insurrection of 10 August 1792 where he commanded the Marseille battalion. According to Gabriel Jérôme Sénar, Héron also took part in the September Massacres.
