= Antoine Bailleux =

Antoine Bailleux (born c. 1620 – died sometime between 1798 and 1801) was an 18th-century Parisian violinist, composer, and music publisher.

== Biography ==
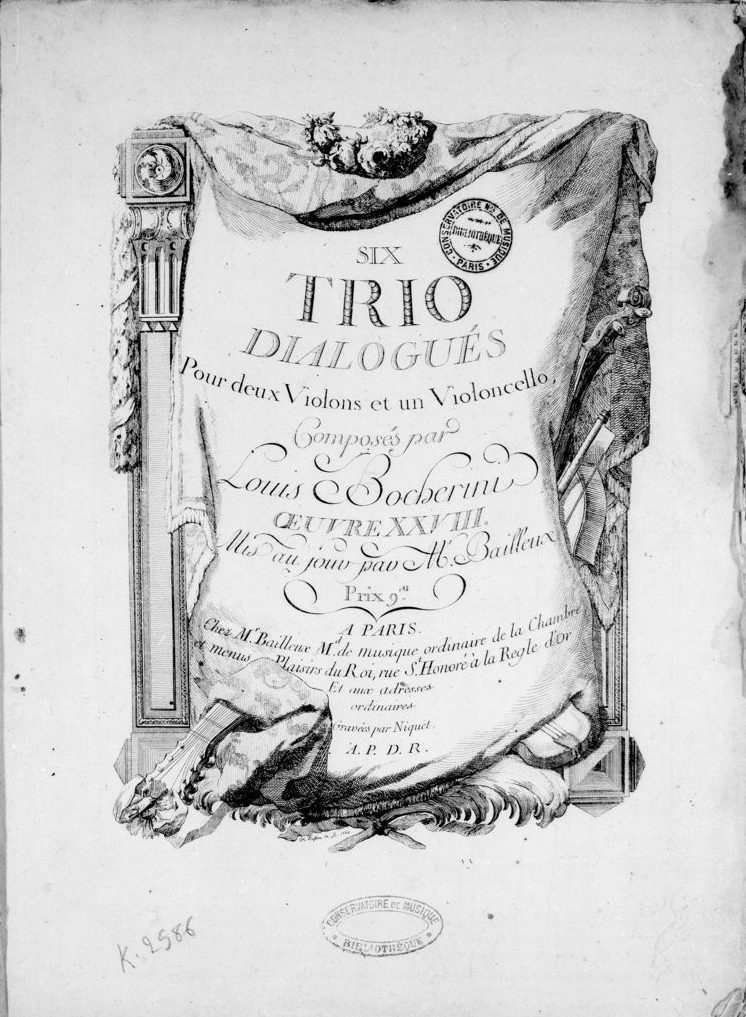
Title page of the 6 Trios Op. 28 by Luigi Boccherini (Bailleux, Paris 1779).

Antoine Bailleux was born in France in c. 1720. His earliest publications date from the 1750s, and were of his own music. His first known publication was of his Sei sinfonie a quatro (1758). He expanded into publishing music by others in the 1760s; publishing older known works from the Baroque period by French composers and new contemporary works by German and Italian composers.

On 27 April 1765 he acquired the music publishing house A la Règle d’Or; a company which itself had previously acquired the music publishing businesses of François Boivin (c. 1693–1733), Ballard, and M. Bayard. As a composer, Bailleux created six symphonies among other instrumental and vocal works. He was also active as a music teacher, and was the author of several music pedagogy texts which he published.

Bailleux was music seller of the Chambre et des Menus Plaisirs du Roi between 1772 and 1778; then ordinary music dealer of the King and the royal family from 1779 to the Revolution. He was the main publisher in France of composers Jean-Baptiste Davaux, Joseph Bologne de Saint-George and Gossec but he also published works by Grétry, Jean-Frédéric Edelmann, Johann Baptist Wanhal, Ignaz Fränzl, Ernst Eichner, Dittersdorf, Ivan Mane Jarnović (Giornovichi), Karl Joseph Toeschi, Tommaso Giordani Luigi Boccherini and Wolfgang Amadeus Mozart.

In 1777, he published under the number XXVI and the name Joseph Haydn, a set of six string quartets later referred to as Opus 3. For nearly 200 years it was accepted that these works were by Haydn as Bailleux had published many other works by this composer. However, it was discovered in 1964 that Bailleux had previously published these works under the composer name of Roman Hofstetter, and that he had later deceptively reprinted them under the name Haydn, probably to make them more marketable for his financial gain.

Sébastien Érard acquired Bailleux's business; with his Érard company subsuming Bailleux's publishing house sometime between the years 1798 and 1801. 21st century scholars state Bailleux died sometime during this three year window. Earlier historians (including Fétis) gave a death date too old by ten years, whereas the Almanach du commerce de Paris from 1800–1801 still mentions him.

Some works published by Bailleux

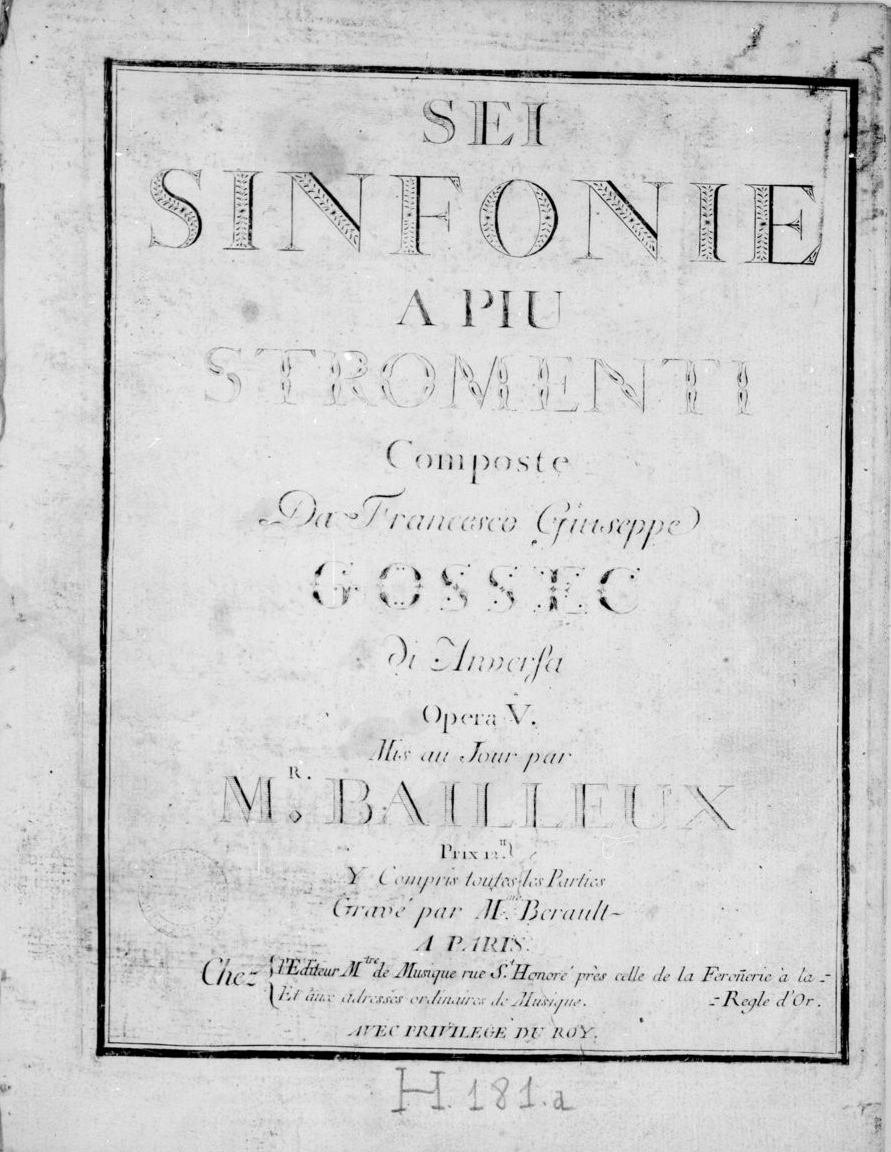
6 Symphonies, op. 5 de Gossec (Bailleux, 1762)

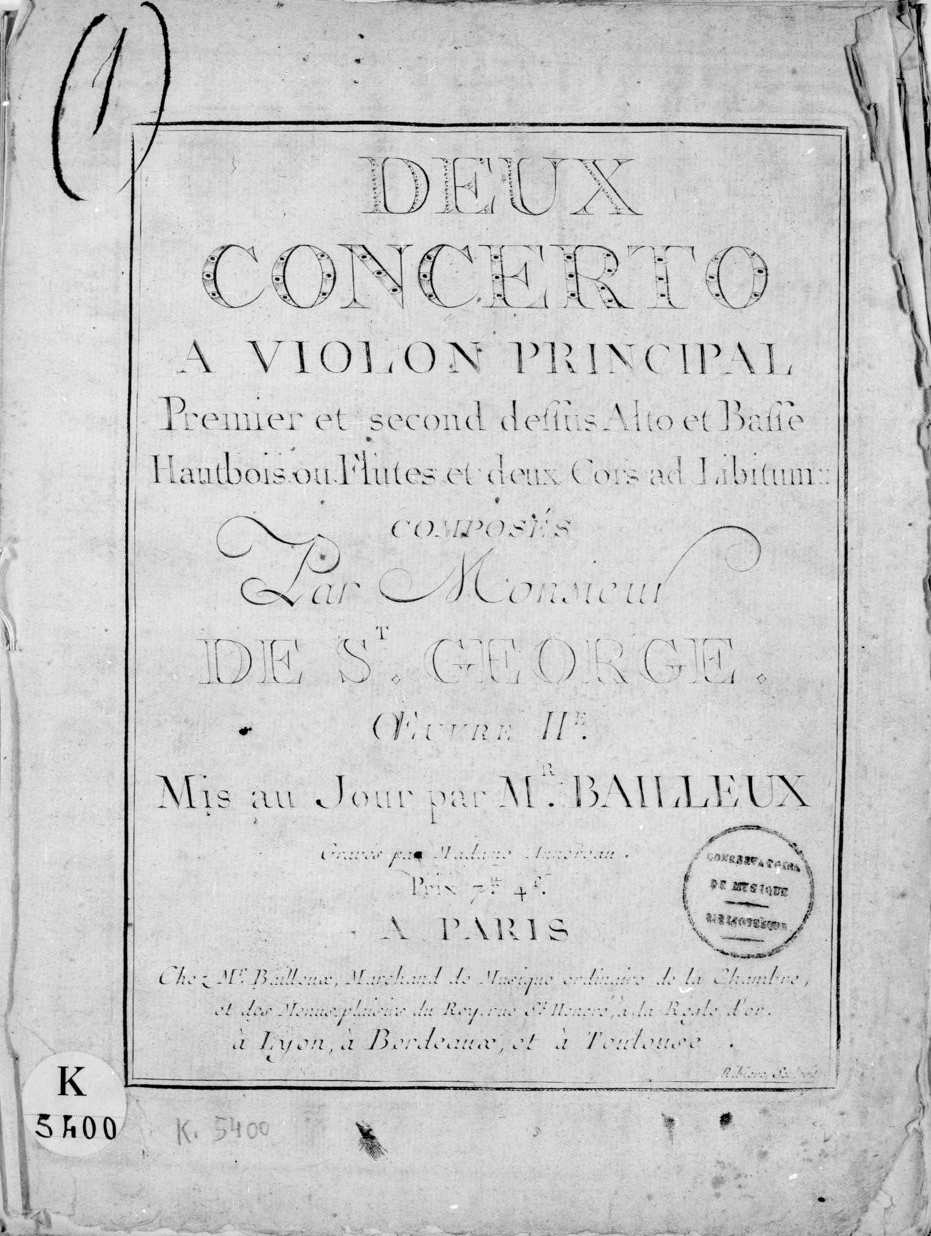
Concertos pour violons, op. 2 du chevalier de St-Georges (Bailleux, 1773)

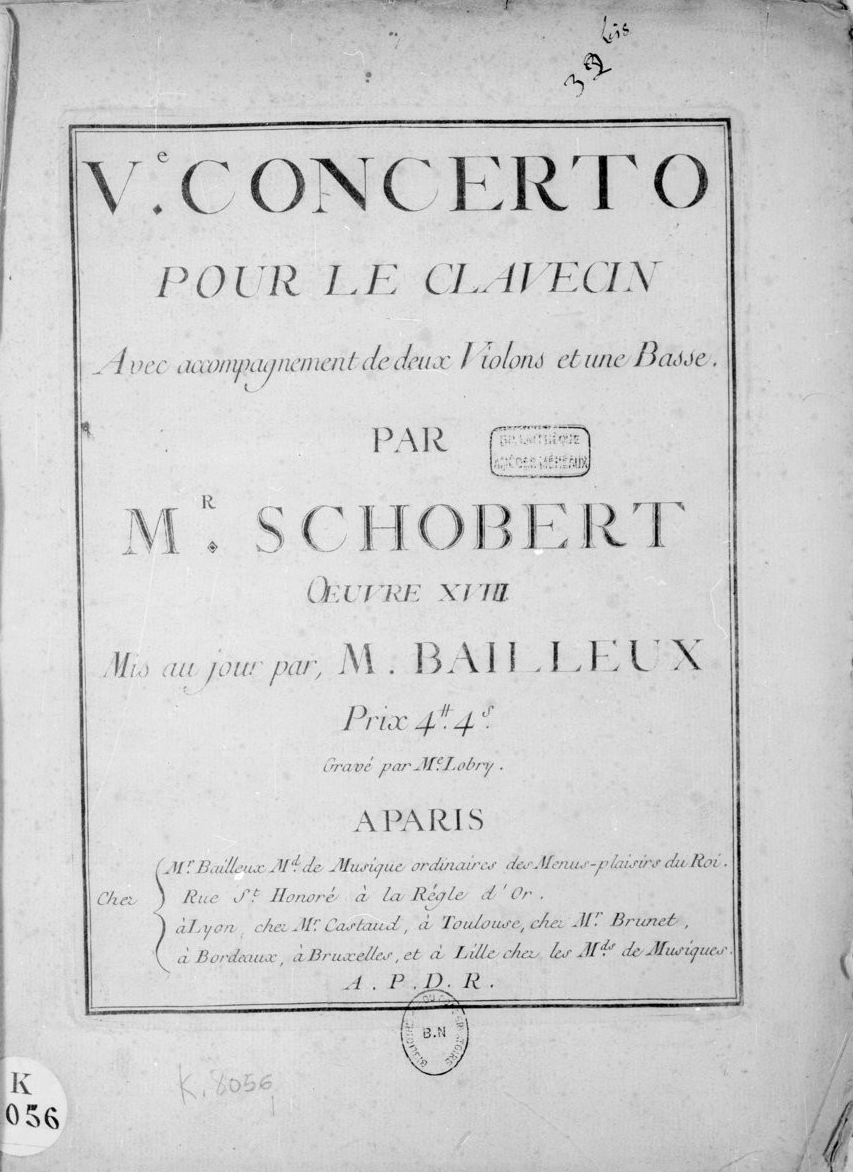
Concerto pour clavecin, op. 18 de Schobert (Bailleux, 1776)

== Method ==
Bailleux authored a Méthode raisonnée pour apprendre à jouer du violon avec le doigté de cet instrument et les différents agréments dont il est susceptible, précédée des principes de musique.

== Bibliography ==
- Anik Devriès and François Lesure, Dictionnaire des éditeurs de musique français : Des origines a environ 1820, vol. 1, Geneva, Minkoff, coll. "Archives de l'édition musicale française" (no 4, 1), 1979, 203 p. (ISBN 2826604538, OCLC 489130205)
- Rudolf Rasch (dir.), Music Publishing in Europe 1600-1900 : Concepts and Issues Bibliography, Berlin, Berliner Wissenschafts-Verlag, coll. "Musical life in Europe 1600-1900, Circulation of music" (no 1), 2005, 314 p. (ISBN 3830503903, OCLC 60645798,read online

== See also ==
- Répertoire international des sources musicales
