= 1777 in music =

== Events ==
- Wolfgang Amadeus Mozart resigns his position in the Salzburg court.
- Samuel Arnold becomes musical director of the Haymarket Theatre in London.
- Über die Theorie der Musik by Johann Nikolaus Forkel is published in Göttingen.
- Thomas Arne and his wife are reconciled after a separation of over twenty years.

== Opera ==
- Agostino Accorimboni – Nitteti
- Luigi de Baillou – Il casino di campagna
- Domenico Cimarosa
  - L'Armida immaginaria
  - Il fanatico per gli antichi romani
  - I tre amanti
- Christoph Willibald Gluck – Armide
- Joseph Haydn – Il mondo della luna
- Elizabeth Ryves – The Prude

== Classical music ==
- Carl Philipp Emanuel Bach – 4 Keyboard Trios, Wq.91
- Johann Christian Bach – 6 Keyboard Concertos, Op. 13
- Johann Christoph Friedrich Bach – Flute Sonata No.1 in D major
- Charles Burney – 4 Sonatas for Keyboard 4-Hands
- Giuseppe Maria Cambini – 6 Flute Quintets, Op. 8
- Michael Haydn – Missa S Hieronymi
- Gottfried August Homilius – Christmas Oratorio
- John Keeble – Diapason Movement in F major
- Wolfgang Amadeus Mozart – Piano Concerto No. 9 ("Jeunehomme")
- Josef Mysliveček – Isacco figura del redentore (oratorio)
- Antonio Salieri – La Passione di Gesu Christo
- Joseph Bologne Saint-Georges – 2 Symphonies concertantes, Op. 9
- Carl Stamitz
  - 6 Symphonies, Op. 13
  - Clarinet Concerto No.2 in B-flat major
- Johann Baptist Wanhal – Violin Concerto in B-flat major

== Popular Music ==
- "A-Hunting We Will Go" w.m. Thomas Arne (written for insertion into a London production of The Beggar's Opera and first sung by the contralto Mrs. Farrell playing Captain Macheath (sic.))

== Methods and theory writings ==
- Johann Nikolaus Forkel – Über die Theorie der Musik
- Johann Caspar Heck – The Art of Playing Thorough Bass
- Valentin Roeser – Gamme et 12 Duo pour la Flûte Traversière

== Births ==
- January 1 – Micah Hawkins, composer
- January 3 – Louis Poinsot, instrument maker
- January 8 – Filippo Traetta, musicologist
- January 12 – Stepan Davydov, Russian composer (died 1825)
- April 18 – Ignac Ruzitska, composer
- May 4 – Charles-Louis-Joseph Hanssens, composer
- May 8 – Mateli Magdalena Kuivalatar, Finnish-Karelian folk singer
- May 12 – Giovanni Morandi, Italian composer (died 1856)
- May 28 – Joseph-Henri-Ignace Mees, composer
- June 2 – Christian Traugott Tag, composer
- September 30 – Ramon Felix Cuellar y Altarriba, composer
- October 3 – Hedda Hjortsberg, ballerina
- October 6 – William Russell, organist and composer
- November 5 – Filippo Taglioni, dancer and choreographer
- December 16 – János Fusz, composer

== Deaths ==
- January 1 – Emanuele Barbella, composer
- January 22 – Simon Leduc, composer violinist (born 1742)
- March 1 – Georg Christoph Wagenseil
- July 27 – William Hayes, composer (b. 1708)
- August 17 – Giuseppe Scarlatti, composer
- August 23 – Giuseppe Sellitti, composer
- September 1 – Johann Ernst Bach, composer
- November – Marco Coltellini, opera librettist (b. 1724)
- November 30 – Jean-Marie Leclair the younger, composer (b. 1703)
- December 21 – Anton Cajetan Adlgasser, organist (b. 1729)
