= Abbé Alexandre-Auguste Robineau =

French painter and musician (1747–1828)

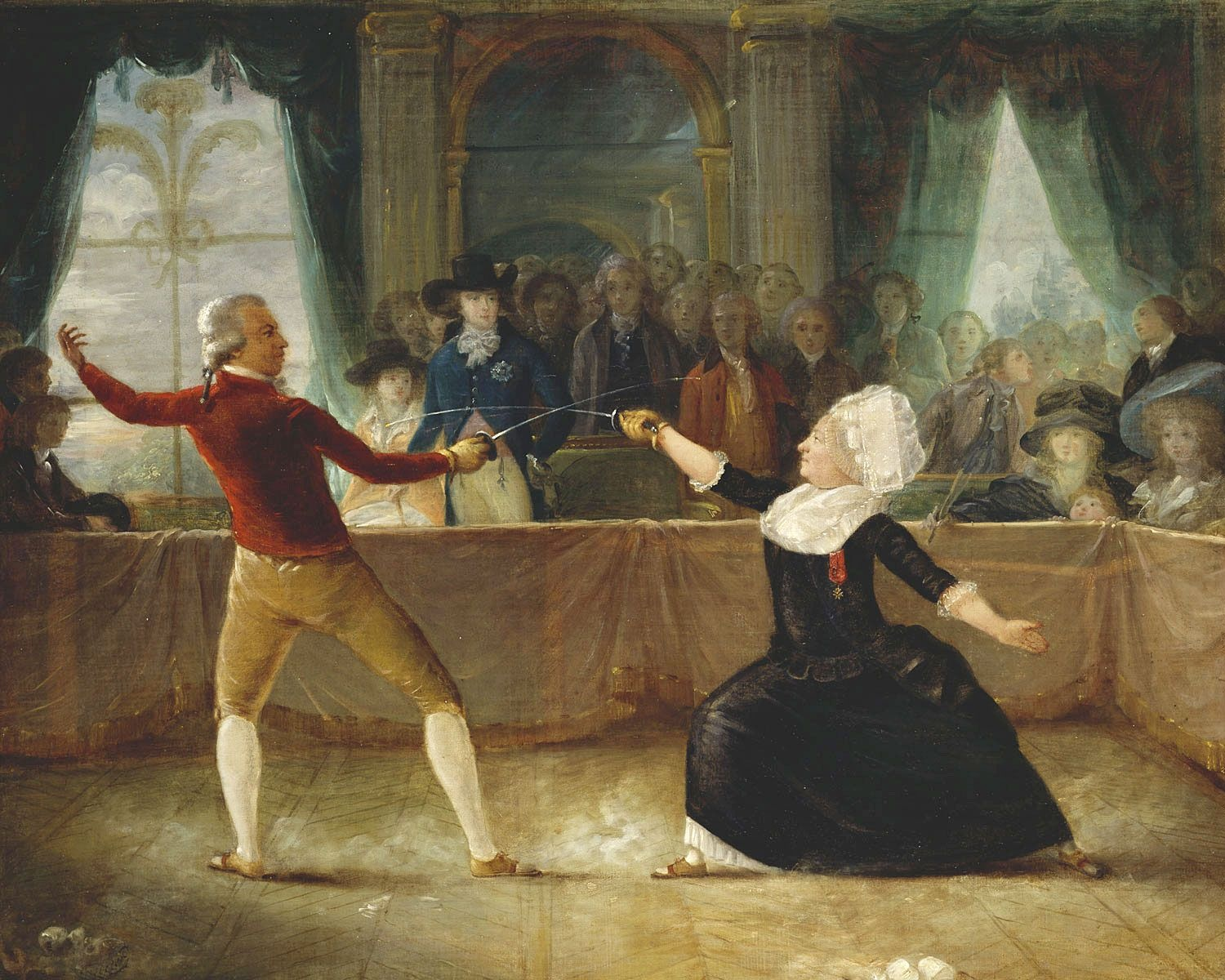
- Born: April 23, 1747 Paris
- Died: January 13, 1828 (at 80 years old) in 5th arrondissement of Paris
- Known for: Painter, violinist, conductor, musician, composer, Catholic priest
- Father: Charles jean Robineau

Alexandre-Auguste Robineau, born April 23, 1747, in Paris where he died January 13, 1828, was a French painter and musician, as well as a period as a Catholic priest. He used the name Alexandre for his music, and Auguste for his paintings.

== Biography ==
He was the son of the painter Charles-Jean Robineau, Alexandre-Auguste Robineau studied painting at his side, and for music, as a composer and violinist, under the direction of Pierre Gaviniès in 1754.

At the age of seven, he became a chorister at the Sainte-Chapelle, where he later took holy orders.

«Robineau was one of Gaviniès' best students»

He entered the clergy before leaving it.

From 1762 to 1767, he studied music mainly at the Conservatorio di Santa Maria di Loreto as a violin and composition student under Antonio Lolli, one of the most renowned Italian violinists and composers of the 18th century, master of the legendary Chevalier de Saint Georges.

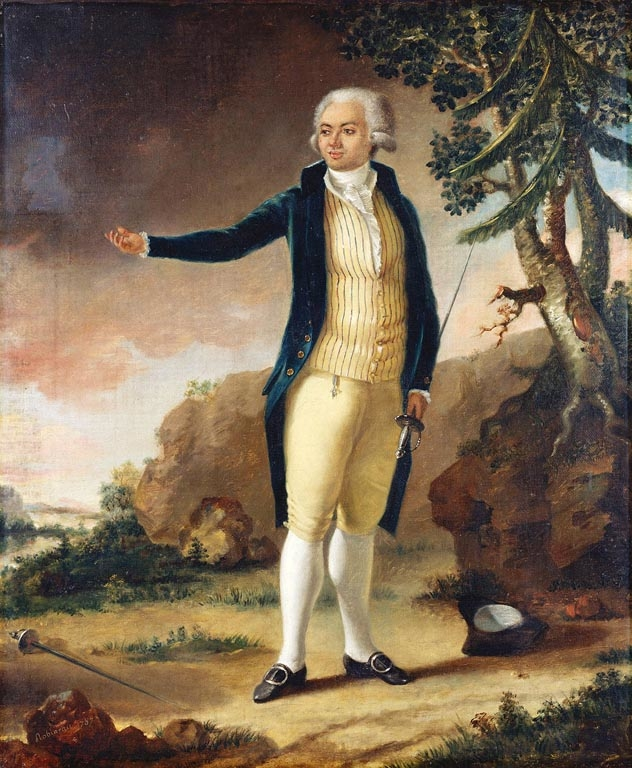
Alexandre-Auguste Robineau (1747–1828) - The Chevalier de Saint-George (1745–1799) in Royal Collection, in 1787

In Italy (Naples), Robineau's success was overwhelming, to the point that he was given the nickname « Lollinelli ». He often appeared at the Concert Spirituel.

There was a time when he was also a student of Antonio Sacchini.

He survived an assassination attempt:

Algerian Corsairs:In love with a Neapolitan woman during his adventures in Italy, she and her mother often accompanied him when he played music in villages near Naples. One day, she was kidnapped by Algerian corsairs. Auguste desperately tried to save her but was seriously injured and left for dead at sea. His fellow musicians, despite their weak means of defense, managed to find him and bring him back to life in a fisherman's hut. However, the pain of losing his love and the effects of his injuries plunged Auguste into a serious illness that led to several deep lethargies, one lasting fourteen hours, leading people to believe he was dead.

Auguste, gravely injured by corsairs and declared dead, was placed in the church of the Conservatory in Naples, where he was displayed with his face uncovered. His companions sang vespers and left a guard. At nightfall, Auguste regained consciousness, discovered he was tied up, and caused chaos by falling onto some torches. The guard, frightened, let him escape. Auguste ran to find his companions, who brought him to the infirmary, where it was decided not to bury him until they were sure of his death. This miracle was witnessed by Niccolò Piccinni.

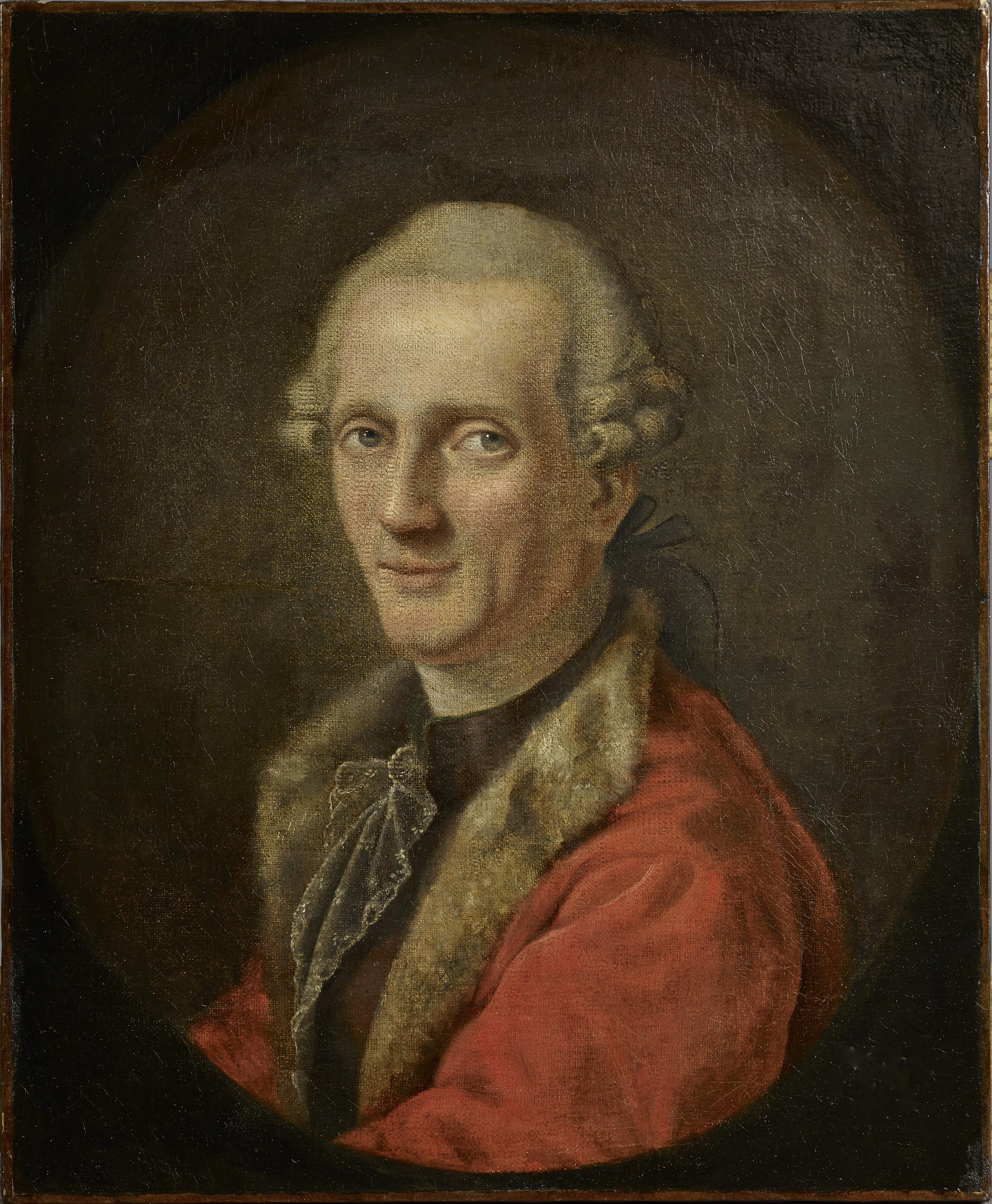
Portrait of Nicollò Piccinni by Alexandre Auguste Robineau in Musée Philharmonie de Paris, in 1783

After his recovery, Auguste returned to France. In Rome, Pope Clement XIV offered him an ecclesiastical career, but Auguste preferred to follow his passion for painting. After three years of intense work, he returned to Paris as a painter. His parents, worried about the combination of arts, encouraged him to accept a position in finance to ensure his stability. His attachment to his mother, whom he found widowed, pushed him to follow their wish.

A brilliant violinist, Robineau often played in the Concert Spirituel, one of the earliest public concert series, after his return to Paris at the end of (1767).

In 1772, he married Adélaïde Bertin de Bourdeilles, daughter of Henri Bertin.

Excerpt from the report of «André-Daniel Laffon de Ladebat to the Minister of the Navy, made to the Consuls on 23 Ventôse Year VI»

In 1775, he had a son named Adel Robineau, who died at the age of 23. Convicted of loyalty to the monarchy, he was sentenced to death during the Reign of Terror. He escaped by following General Lagenetière to Cayenne. He then fled to Suriname and was captured by the Directory's emissaries. He disappeared, drowned in chains according to some, beheaded and preserved in salt according to others.

« He was accused of having a second brother, Auguste, who was a painter, and Alexandre, who was a composer of sonatas »

Because he used the name Alexandre for music and the name Auguste for painting, he was both a painter and music teacher, author of sonatas for violin and bass (1768).

Sonatas for solo violin and bass dedicated to Louis-Jacques d'Audibert de Lussan.

Violin concertos for large orchestra dedicated to Jean-Jacques Bachelier.

He also contributed to "The Art of the Violin," a collection of the greatest artists of the 18th century by Jean-Baptiste Cartier.

His time with Daniel-Charles Trudaine:

Daniel-Charles Trudaine, who offered him a position at Ponts et Chaussées as well as a post as private secretary. Under the protection of Laurent Truguet, Auguste perfected his portrait skills, which would be very useful in his travels (England, Holland, Switzerland, Russia).

However, after eight years, the sudden death of Trudaine ended this relationship (1769).

He spent two years in Bordeaux with his friend, the famous singer Pierre-Jean Garat, still under the protection of Admiral Laurent Truguet.

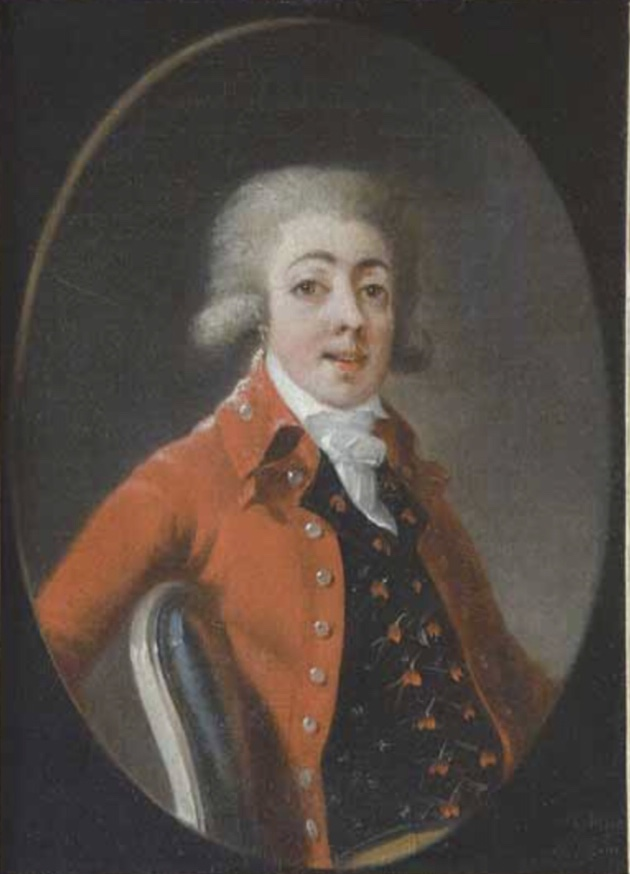
Portrait of the Singer Pierre-Jean Garat (1762–1823) by Alexandre Auguste Robineau c. 1785 In Musée Basque(France)

Then flew to Spain with Garat and Admiral Truguet.

He enjoyed a period of success when he went to Madrid, where, thanks to his connections with M. Truguet, the French Ambassador, he managed to gain attention at the Spanish Court.

He notably painted the portrait of the Prince of Peace and M. Truguet. He was also supposed to paint the Queen with her children, but Truguet's recall ended that opportunity.

After Truguet's departure from Spain, Auguste quickly returned to Paris.

He was secretary and painter of the King's Menus-Plaisirs from 1785 to 1789.

He had significant exchanges with Louis XVI, who specially welcomed him for his painting Le Temps qui découvre la Vérité and allowed him to exhibit it in the royal apartments. Then, in front of his very own eyes, Marie Antoinette, for whom he made several portraits, and their daughter, Marie-Thérèse de France, for whom he painted her dog.

The painting Le Temps qui découvre la Vérité took eight years to complete, and at the time of its exhibition in Amsterdam, Count Dirk van Hogendorp diverted him and advised him to exhibit it in Russia after many adventures. By an incredible twist of fate, just as the Emperor (whose aides-de-camp had given him the most favorable report on the painting) was about to come and see it, war broke out between France and Russia, so His Imperial Majesty left for the armies without seeing it. The French were then forced to leave Russia or swear not to correspond with France, which Auguste did wholeheartedly.

Le Temps qui découvre la Vérité' measured 15 feet high by 10 feet wide.

« The painting 'Le Temps qui découvre la Vérité' is currently lost.»

Until his department was abolished, Denis Pierre Jean Papillon de La Ferté had granted him several leaves to go to England to take advantage of his talents. It was during one of these trips to London that he came into contact with the Prince of Wales, both as a musician and painter, notably to paint, at his request, the duel between the Chevalier de Saint-George and the Chevalier d'Éon at Carlton House.

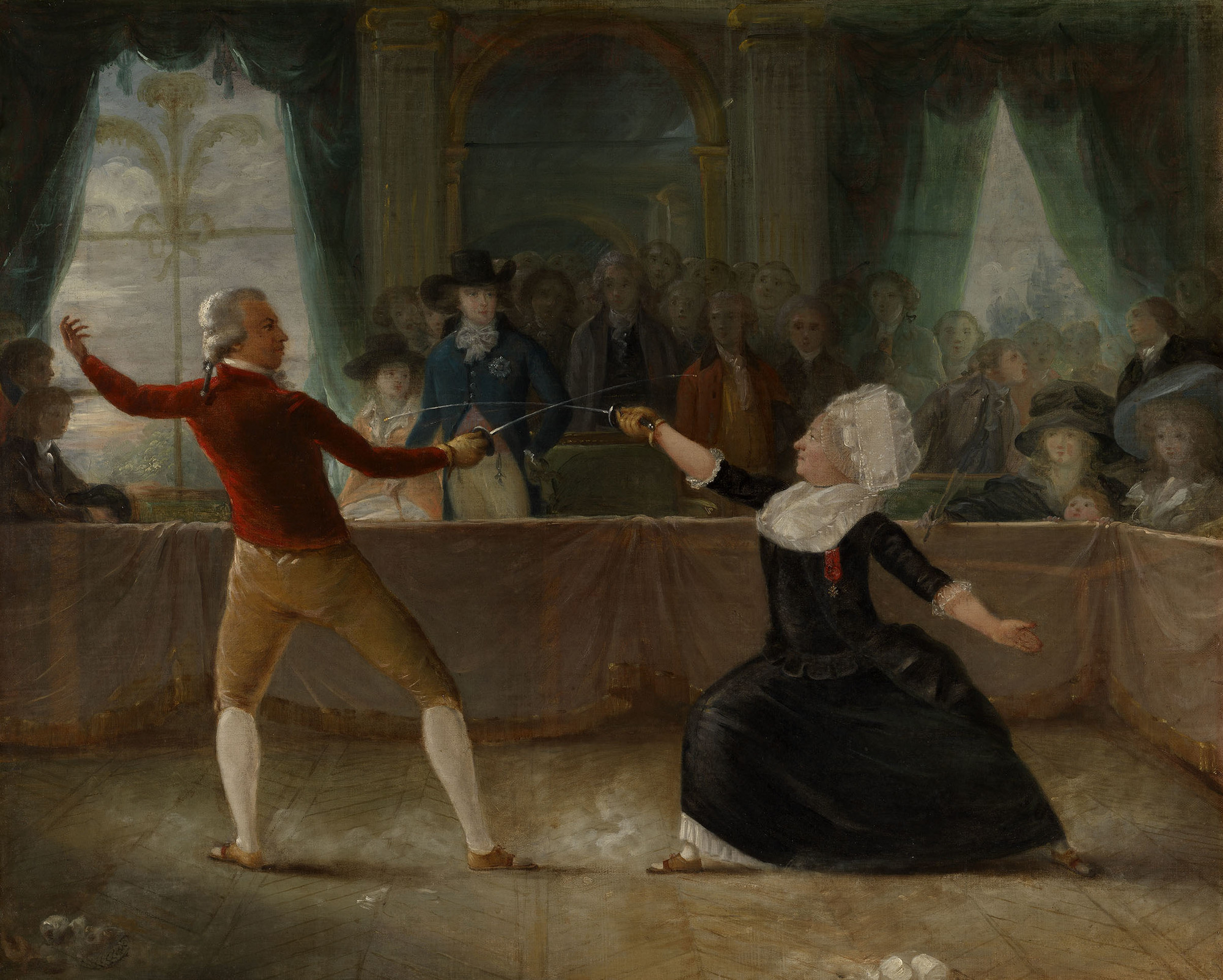
Alexandre-Auguste Robineau (1747–1828) - The Fencing-Match between the Chevalier de Saint-George and the Chevalier d'Eon in Royal Collection

As the Prince sang French romances with infinite taste, he wanted Auguste to be constantly at Carlton House, either to accompany him on the piano or to hear him play the violin.

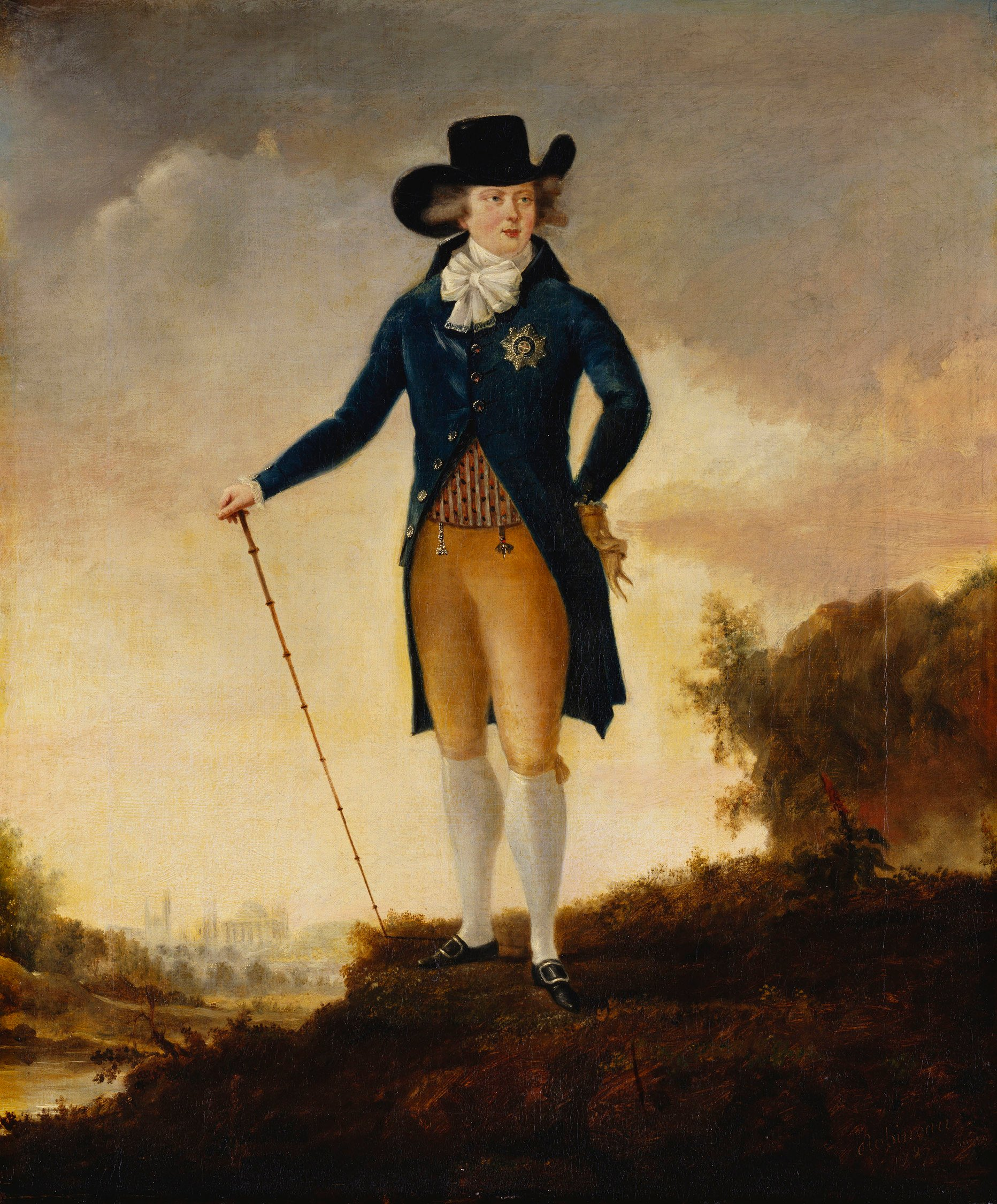
Alexandre-Auguste Robineau (1747–1828) - George IV (1762–1830) when Prince of Wales in Royal Collection

The Prince of Wales said about him:

« Auguste alone could make an opera, compose the music, conduct the orchestra and paint the decorations. . »

He also painted Mrs. Georgiana Cavendish and Mademoiselle Théodore, wife of Jean Duberval, in four different costumes.

His love for France led him to return to Paris after the Revolution (1789).

Upon his return to France

Altercation with Gilbert du Motier de La Fayette:

During the Federation of 1791 in Paris, Auguste, who was having coffee at the Palais Royal, expressed his indignation at the insolence of the federates toward the King. Accused of aristocracy and arrested, he was taken to the Committee of Research, where M. de La Fayette ordered, "Take Monsieur to the city hall's guardhouse, and be sure he has no weapon to destroy himself; we need examples at this moment." In front of the angry crowd, Auguste was seized by the rioters but managed to escape their fury. In the guardhouse, ashamed for his family, he stabbed himself eight times with a bayonet before collapsing on a camp bed, letting the people believe he was dead. Transferred to Hôtel-Dieu, he was saved by M. Dessaux and the Sisters of Charity in less than two months.

From 1789 to 1792, Robineau was the conductor at the Théâtre-Français.

At that time, he published his trios dedicated to Madame la Duchesse de Polignac.

« He had a special relationship with the Duchess of Polignac, who protected him from Queen Marie Antoinette at the King's Court. »

André Chéron and the top artists, in the presence of all the compositions, assured:

« That this work needed no protection, being worthy of a student of Sacchini. . »

In 1795, Pierre Gavinies was admitted by competition as a professor at the Paris Conservatory, where he was once again Robineau's master at the Concert Spirituel, counting among his students Simon Le Duc, Antoine-Laurent Baudron, Isidore Bertheaume, Nicolas Capron, Marie Alexandre Guénin, Jean-Jérôme Imbault, Alexandre-Auguste Robineau; his students were distinguished by their unparalleled excellence.

"Around 1800 Auguste Robineau, after twelve years of artistic development, organized an exhibition of his works in Paris and Amiens during the Congress. The exhibition featured 11:

A monumental painting, 15 feet high by 10 feet wide, entitled Time Discovering the Truth.

A portrait of Napoleon Bonaparte, as a "peace-making warrior," recognized by the Congress ambassadors and the Amiens staff as the most likeness ever made of this Hero.

An innovative lighting effect that impressed even other artists.

Several portraits by contemporary artists, including one of Robineau himself.

Although he had wanted admission to be free, the cost of transportation and exhibition led to a paid admission fee. Robineau also planned to make additional portraits during the exhibition. The event was located near the Customs House and its opening was announced in the press."

"Robineau helped the artist François Diday launch his career."

"Robineau would have discovered his artistic gifts and would have recommended him as an artist of the future to the most influential members of the Society of Arts.

François Diday was then granted a travel grant to Italy (1824). In 1823 »

He died in 1828 in Paris.

Portrait de Robineau à la Royal Collection

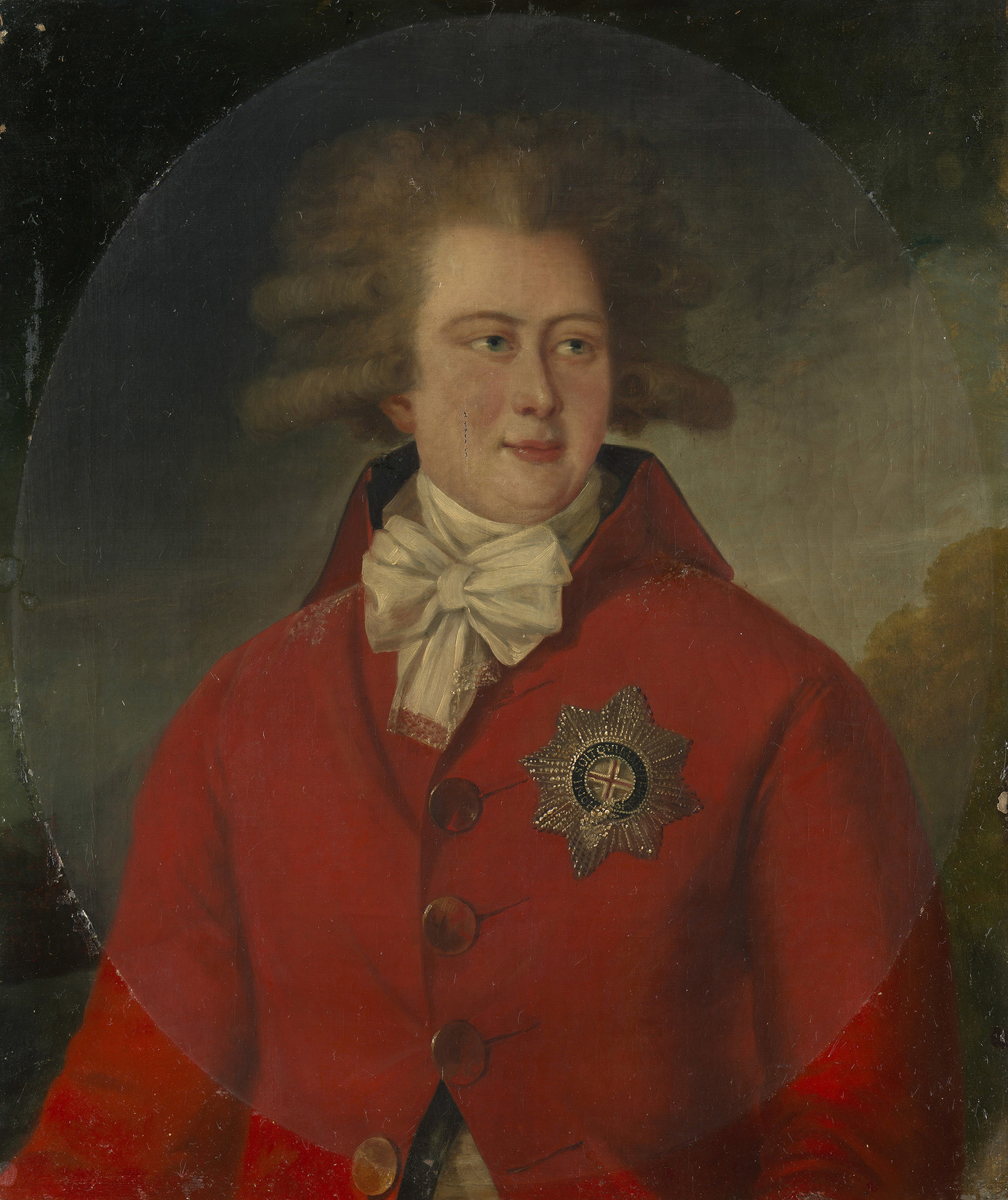
Alexandre-Auguste Robineau (1747–1828) - George IV (1762–1830) when Prince of Wales - RCIN 405016 - Royal Collection

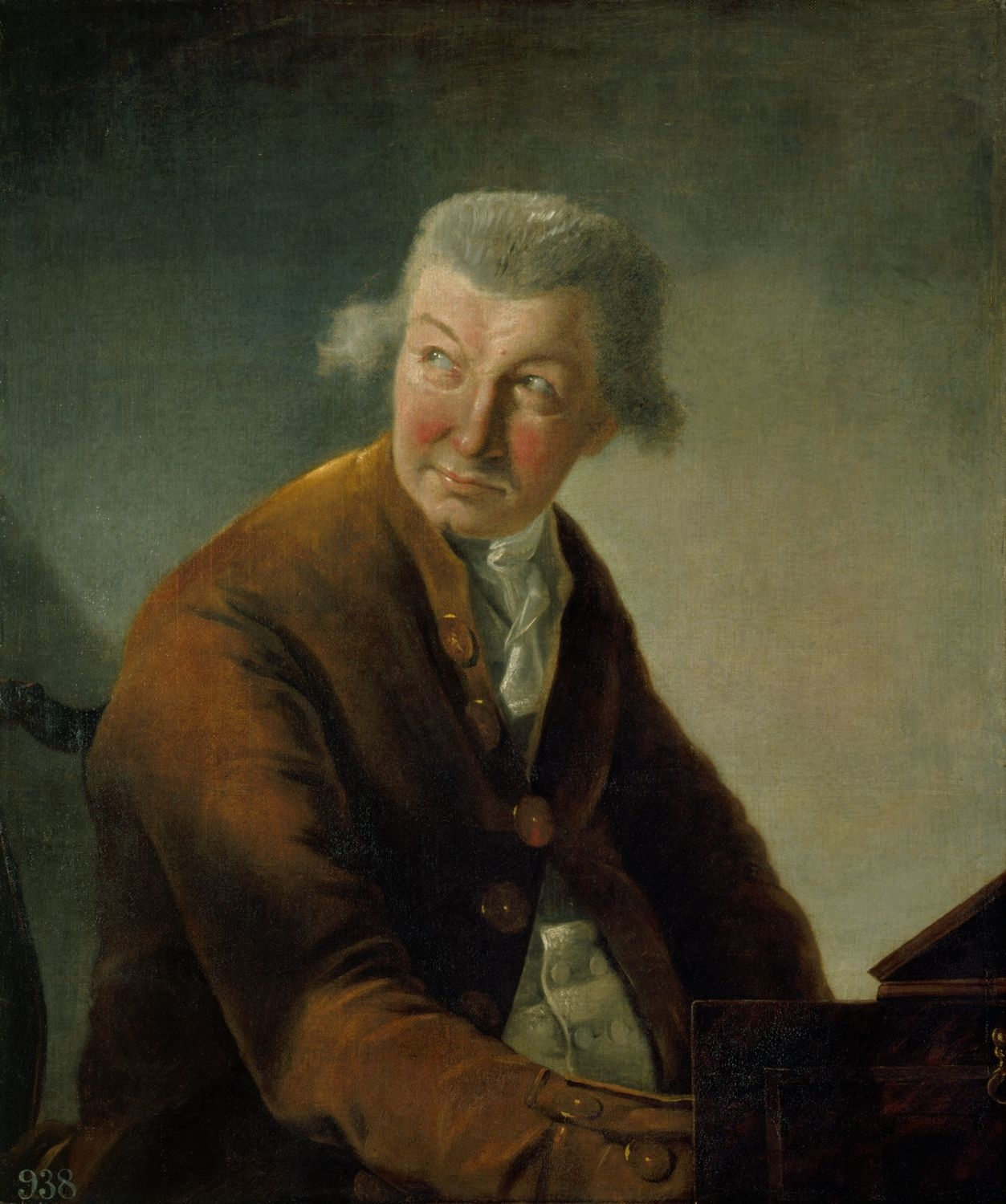
Alexandre-Auguste Robineau (1747–1828) - Karl Friedrich Abel (1725–1787) - RCIN 403540 - Royal Collection

Portrait de Robineau au British Muséum

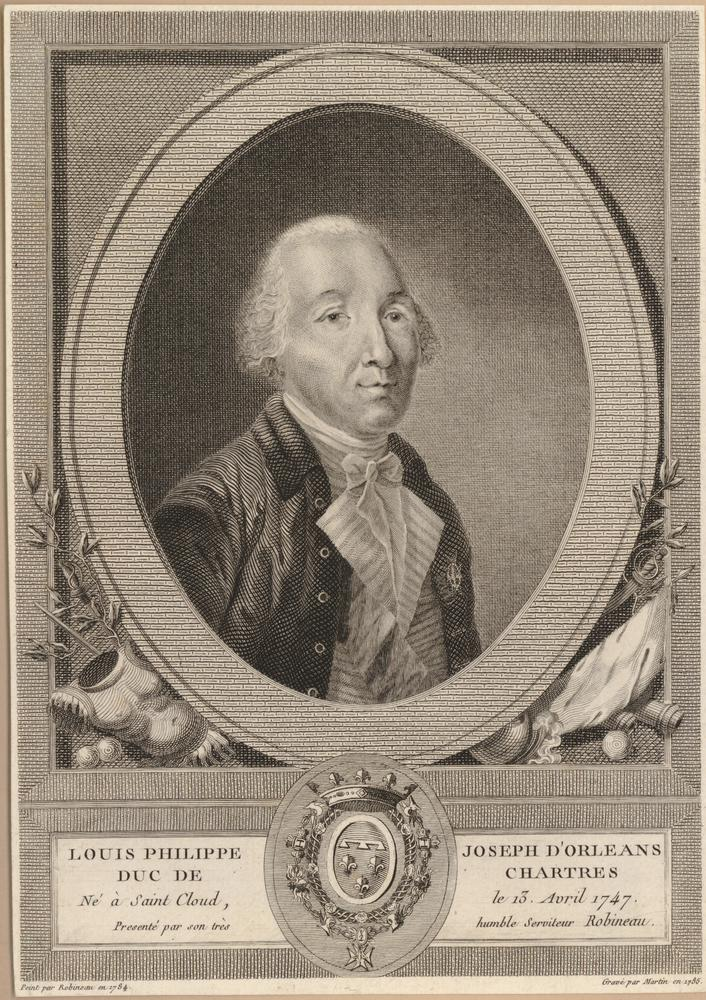
Portrait of Louis Philippe Joseph when Duke of Chartres (Peint par Robineau en 1784 - Gravé par Martin en 1785", title, sitter's date of birth, and dedication by Robineau Duke of Orléans)

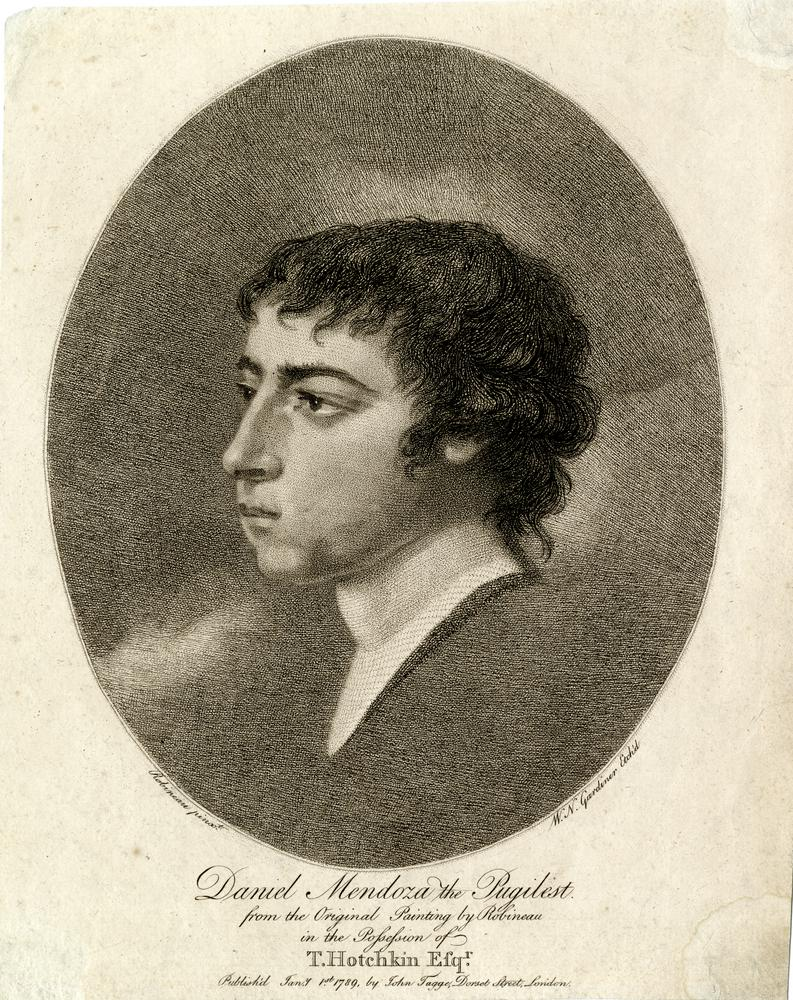
Portrait of the boxer Daniel Mendoza, head only facing to left, in three-quarter profile in an oval; after Robineau. 1789 Etching and stipple

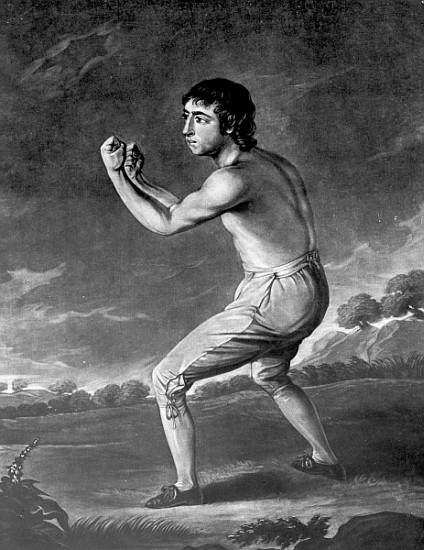
Daniel Mendoza (1764–1836), by Alexandre auguste Robineau (1747–1828) engraved by Henry Kinsbury, 1789
