= Pierre Leduc =

French violinist and music publisher (1755–1826)

- Born: 17 February 1755; Paris
- Died: 18 October 1826 (aged 71); Bordeaux
- Occupations: Violinist; Music publisher
- Years active: 1775–1811

Pierre Leduc or Le Duc (17 February 1755 – 18 October 1826) was a French violinist and music publisher, active from 1775 to 1811.

== Biography ==
The publisher's signature on a score by Joseph Haydn, the Symphony in G major, Hob I:92, published by Leduc in 1789.

The younger brother of violinist and composer Simon Le Duc (born in 1742), Pierre Leduc was likewise a violinist. He studied with his brother, and his repertoire featured works by Simon. He was presented at the Concert Spirituel in spring 1770 and often appeared thereafter with favorable reviews. The brothers sometimes played together, Simon "the older" willingly leaving the first part to Pierre "the young," as they were described on the title page of the scores.

His publishing activities began in March 1775. Simon published his works independently. Although monopolized by his editorial job, his concertizing activities continued despite everything at the Concert spirituel. In 1776, he married the daughter of the publisher Henry.

In 1782, he acquired the fund of editor Preudhomme, and in December 1784, took over that of Louis-Balthazar de La Chevardière. Some sources state that he bought Venier's business around 1781–1782 but this is incorrect, as Venier was bought by Charles-Georges Boyer in 1784.

His catalog was diverse. It consisted at first of serious chamber and orchestral pieces, then, beginning in the 1790s, of a larger quantity of light music for amateurs. Composers such as Antonio Salieri (Les Danaïdes), Luigi Boccherini, and Joseph Haydn, were part of his catalog.

Following a brief experience in piano manufacturing, which brought him close to bankruptcy in March 1804, he settled for some time in Hamburg, but resumed his Parisian business in August 1808. Apparently it was his son, Auguste Leduc (1779-1823), who acted in his absence. Upon his return, he worked together with his second son, Jean-Jacques Leduc (1792-1855), and published music magazines until February 1811, when he retired.

In November 1819, he was a music teacher in Bordeaux; there he died in poverty in October 1826.

Alphonse Leduc (1804–1868), also a music publisher from 1842, had no connection with Pierre or his sons.

== Bibliography ==
- A. Devriès, Deux dynasties d'éditeurs et de musiciens : les Leduc, RBM, xxviii–xxx (1974), (p. 195-213)
- Harden, Jean (2001). "Leduc [Le Duc] (2) : Pierre Leduc [le jeune]". In Sadie, Stanley; Tyrrell, John (eds.). The New Grove Dictionary of Music and Musicians (2nd ed.). London: Macmillan. ISBN 978-1-56159-239-5.

== See also ==
- Répertoire international des sources musicales
