= Jean-Jérôme Imbault =

French violinist and music publisher

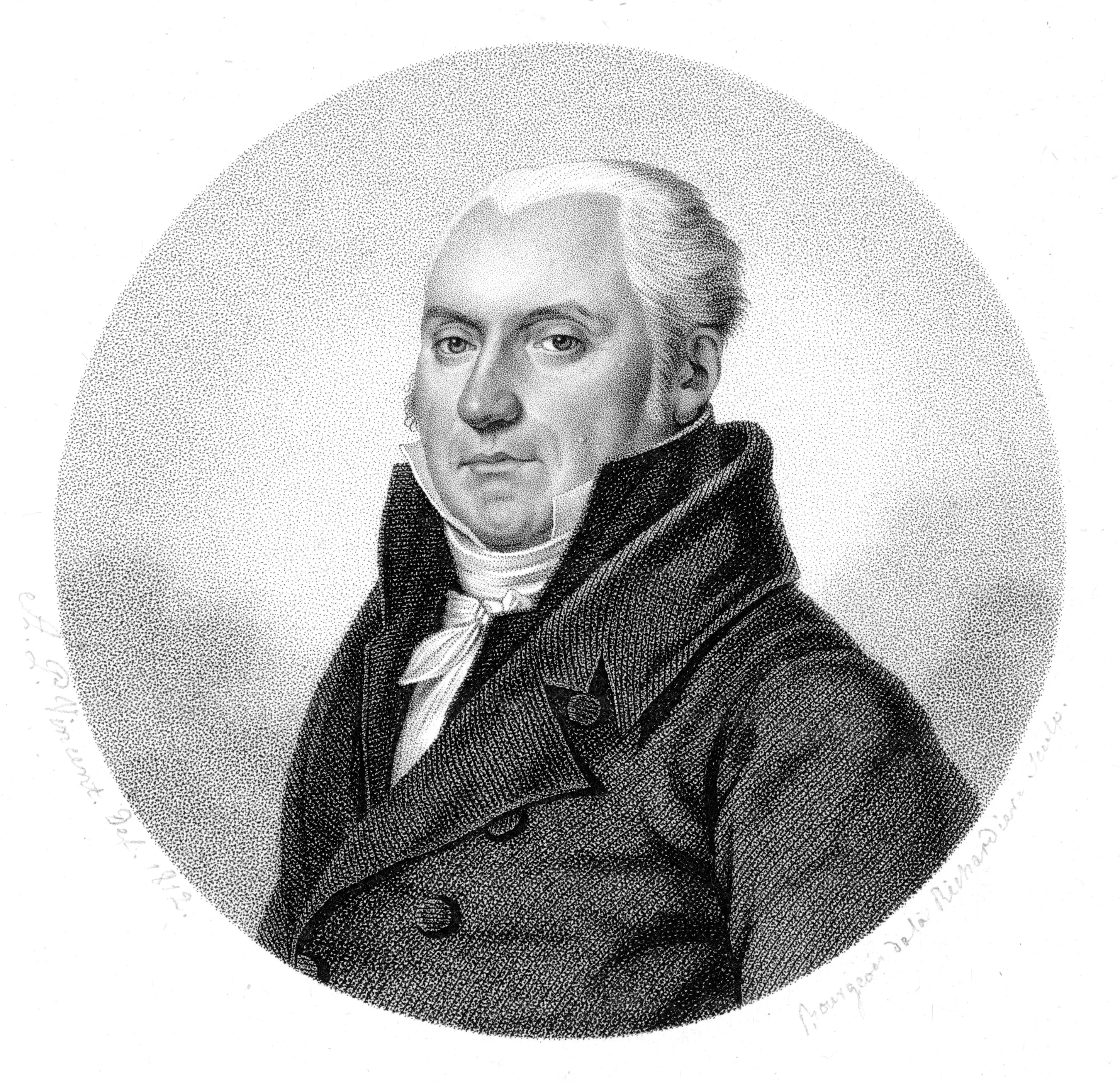
- Jean-Jérôme Imbault; Engraving, 1812, after Antoine-Paul Vincent
- Born: 9 March 1753; Paris
- Died: 15 April 1832 (aged 79); Paris
- Occupations: Music publisher Violinist

Jean-Jérôme Imbault (9 March 1753 – 15 April 1832) was a French violinist and music publisher at the end of the 18th century and the beginning of the 19th century (with Sieber).

== Short biography ==
As a child, Imbault studied with violinist Pierre Gaviniès. He made his debut aged 17 years in a concerto; the 1st of April 1770 issue of the Mercure de France saw him as full of promise, but ten years later the same magazine was less enthusiastic and spoke of his "significant timidity" (April 1781). Thereafter, his musical activity was limited to education and participation in various orchestras, notably the Concert Spirituel, the Concert Olympique and in 1810, the Chapelle impériale. Sometimes he was first violin and sometimes even a soloist.

=== Editions ===
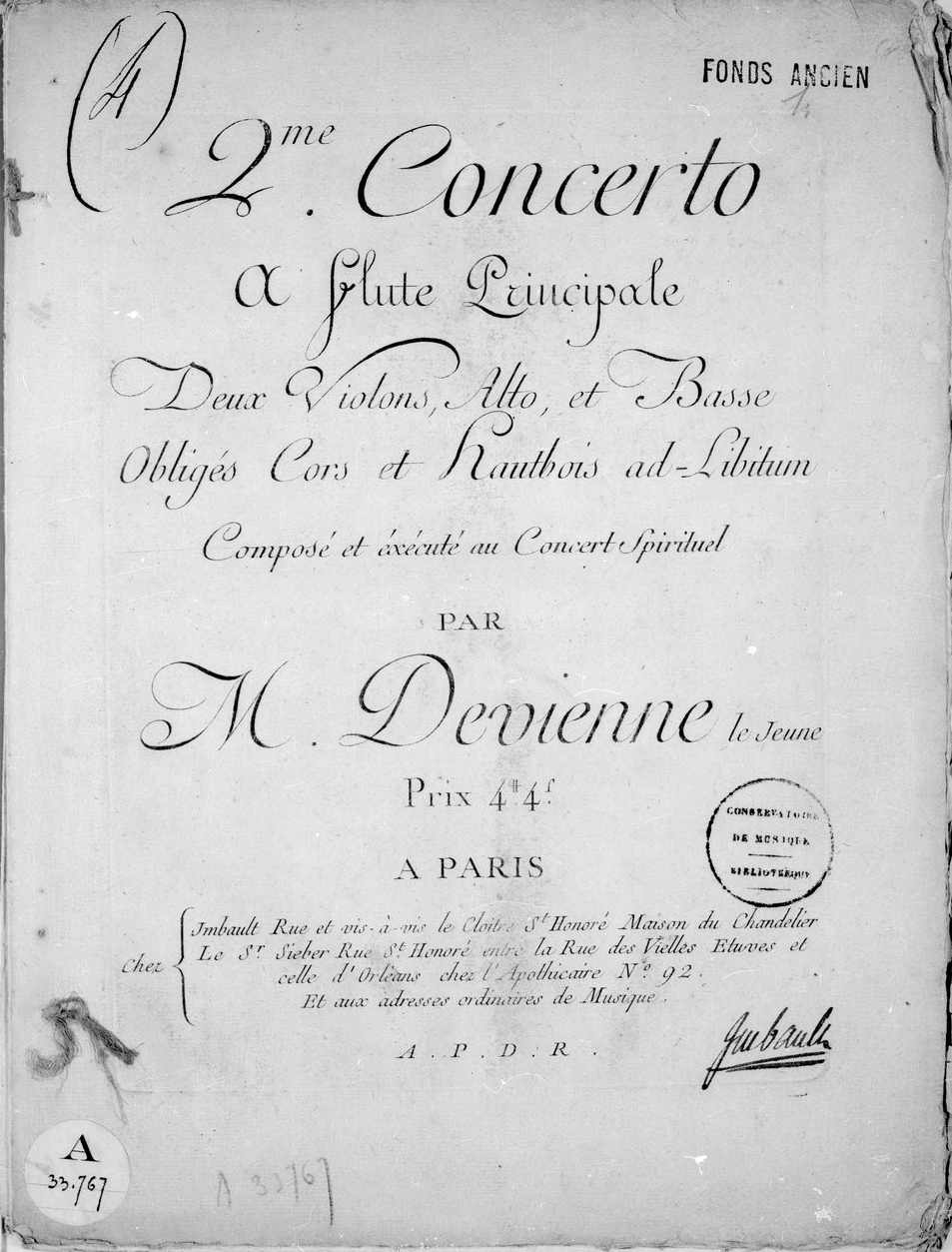
Title page of the second flute concerto by François Devienne, published by Imbault in 1783 (fonds BnF).

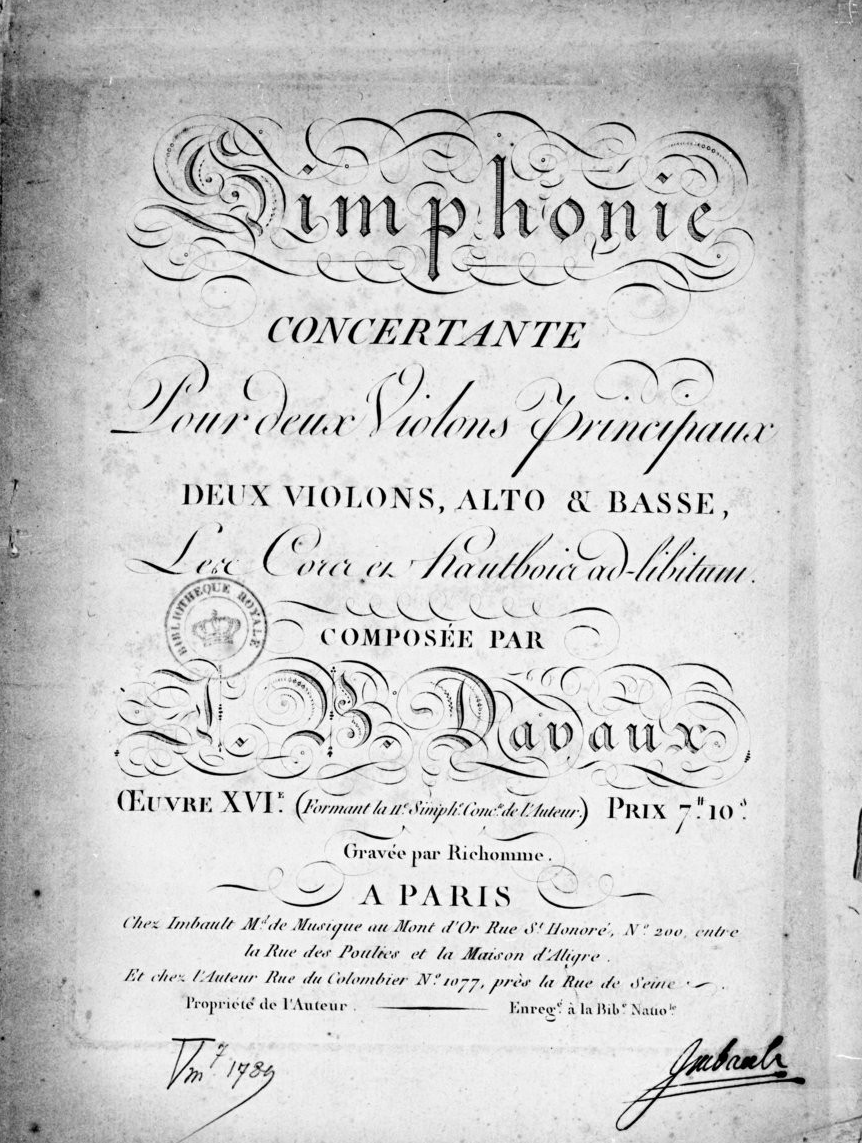
Title page of the Symphonie concertante, Opus 16, by Jean-Baptiste Davaux (Paris, 1800, ed. Imault)

Imbault established a sheet music publishing house in the beginning of the 1780s. It worked the first year thanks to the help of Jean-Georges Sieber (the other great publisher of the time,) who founded his own music publishing house, "À la règle d’or", in 1771. Their association was made public on 2 August 1783 with the release of the second flute concerto by François Devienne (1759–1803). From November 1784, ads feature him alone for publications by Jean-Baptiste Cartier and Grétry. His sign, "Le Mont d’or", was situated rue Saint-Honoré. He presented himself first as "marchand de musique et de cordes d’instrument", then, in early 1811, as "teacher and music publisher".

In catalogs published between 1786 and 1803 and especially a 284 pages catalog dated 1791 or 1792 - containing about 200 instrumental works - one can follow the considerable importance of the company's publications. A great number of important composers were presented: Haydn (including the Symphonies Parisiennes (#82 to 87), Clementi, Viotti, Pleyel, Mozart, Boccherini, Gyrowetz, Paul Wranitzky, Daniel Steibelt, Alessandro Rolla and many other composers.

During the Revolution, he published about one hundred patriotic hymns.

In 1798 or 1799 he bought the store of a publisher named Leblanc for another sale location specified in his advertising: in the "peristyle of the comic Opera Theatre" at 461 rue Favart.

In July 1812, he sold his business to a former clerk, Pierre-Honoré Janet and to Alexandre Cotelle. He retired - but remained at 125 rue Saint-Honoré where the shop was located – living off his royalties

His widow, with whom he had no children, survived him when he died aged 79.

== Bibliography ==
- Catalogue thématique des ouvrages de musique mis au jour par Imbault. Paris, 1791 ou 1792; reprint Geneva, 1972.
- Constant Pierre, Histoire du Concert spirituel 1725–1790, Paris, Société française de musicologie, coll. "Troisième série" (no 3), 1975, 372 p. (OCLC 1638380)

=== Articles ===
- Guiomar, Paule (1966). "J.J. Imbault". Fontes Artis Musicae. 13 (1): 43–46. ISSN 0015-6191. JSTOR 23504593. OCLC 5543268219.
- Rita Benton, "J.-J. Imbault (1753–1832), violoniste et éditeur de musique à Paris", Revue de Musicologie, vol. 62, no 1, 1976, p. 86–103 (ISSN 0035-1601, OCLC 5556249017, DOI 10.2307/928566), read online
- J. Gribenski, Un métier difficile: éditeur de musique à Paris sous la Révolution, Le tambour et la harpe, Lyon, 1989. Éd. J.-R. Julien et J.-R. Mongrédien, Paris, 1991, p. 21–36
- Benton, Rita (2001). "Imbault, Jean-Jérôme". Grove Music Online (8th ed.). Oxford University Press. doi:10.1093/gmo/9781561592630.article.13726. ISBN 978-1-56159-263-0. (subscription, Wikilibrary access, or UK public library membership required)
- Vignal, Marc (2005). Dictionnaire de la musique (in French). Larousse. p. 484. ISBN 2-03-505545-8. OCLC 896013420.
- Anik Devriès and François Lesure, Dictionnaire des éditeurs de musique français. Vol. 1. Genève, Éditions Minkoff, 1979, p. 85.
- Henri Vanhulst, Un catalogue manuscrit de Jean-Jérôme Imbault postérieur à 1812, in "Noter, annoter, éditer la musique : mélanges offerts à Catherine Massip" (Paris: BnF; (coll. "Hautes études médiévales et modernes" (no 103) Genève, Droz, 2012) p. 429–446.
