= Jean-Baptiste Davaux =

French classical violinist and composer (1742–1822)

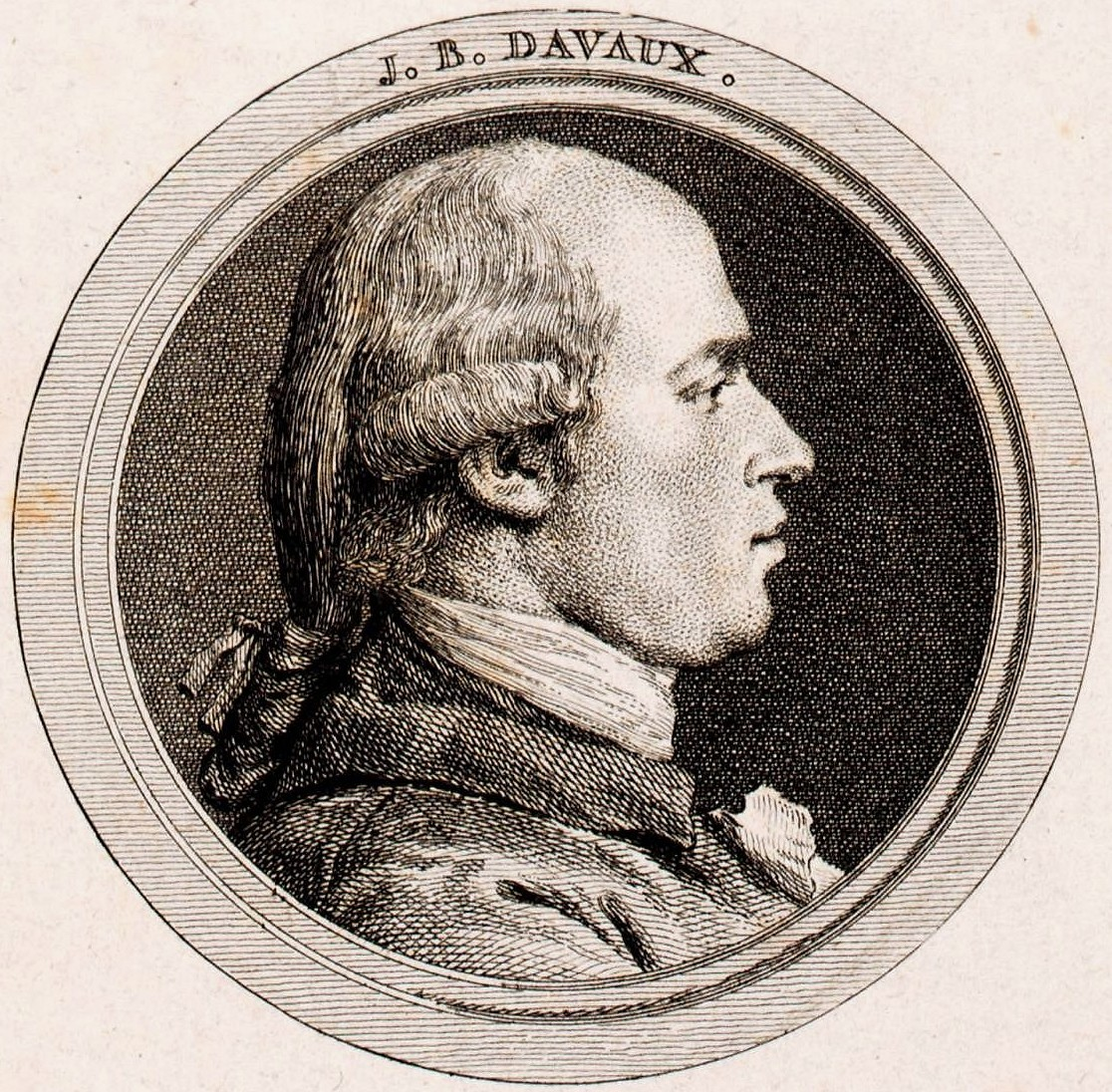
Jean-Baptiste Davaux ca. 1787.

Jean-Baptiste Davaux (19 July 1742 – 2 February 1822) was a French classical violinist and composer.

== Biography ==
Born in La Côte-Saint-André, Davaux came from a bourgeois family. His father was King's Counselor and receiver in the salt attic. He received his first musical education from his parents. He began the violin, in addition to the mandolin. In 1767, Davaux went to Paris, where he quickly acquired a reputation as a violinist and composer. He received a number of public extra-musical appointments and, after the French Revolution, held an official position in the Ministry of War. He then received a pension and the Legion of Honour (28 September 1814) for his thirty years of service. He retired in 1816. He then lived in his home in Yvelines and half of his time in Paris where he gave private concerts.

Davaux's first publications date from 1768, two ariettes, Les charmes de la liberté and Le portrait de Climène (both lost), followed by two opéras comiques presented in 1785 and 1786: Théodore, ou Le bonheur inattendu, libretto by B.-J. Marsollier des Vivetières, after a comedy by Hugh Kelly (False Delicacy), now lost, and Cécilia, ou Les trois tuteurs based on a novel by Fanny Burney, of which some extracts remain.

Considering himself an "amateur", he was recognized by both the public and critics and considered the most esteemed French symphonist of French composers, except Gossec (three symphonies published). Between 1773 and 1788, the Concert Spirituel often presented his works and virtuosos such as Capron, Devienne, Pierre Leduc and Giornovichi played them.

His scores were published in Holland, England and Germany - most often in pirate editions - and his string quartets were played in the United States as early as 1782. (New York Royal Gazette, 27 April 1782).

In 1784, for the publication of his Three Simphonies with Large Orchestra, Op. 11 (1784), he developed on the basis of Breguet's chronometer a device to measure with precision, thirty years before Maelzels' metronome. There were reports in the press of the time: Journal de Paris (8 May 1784) and Le Mercure de France (12 June 1784).

Davaux died in Paris on 2 February 1822.

== Works ==
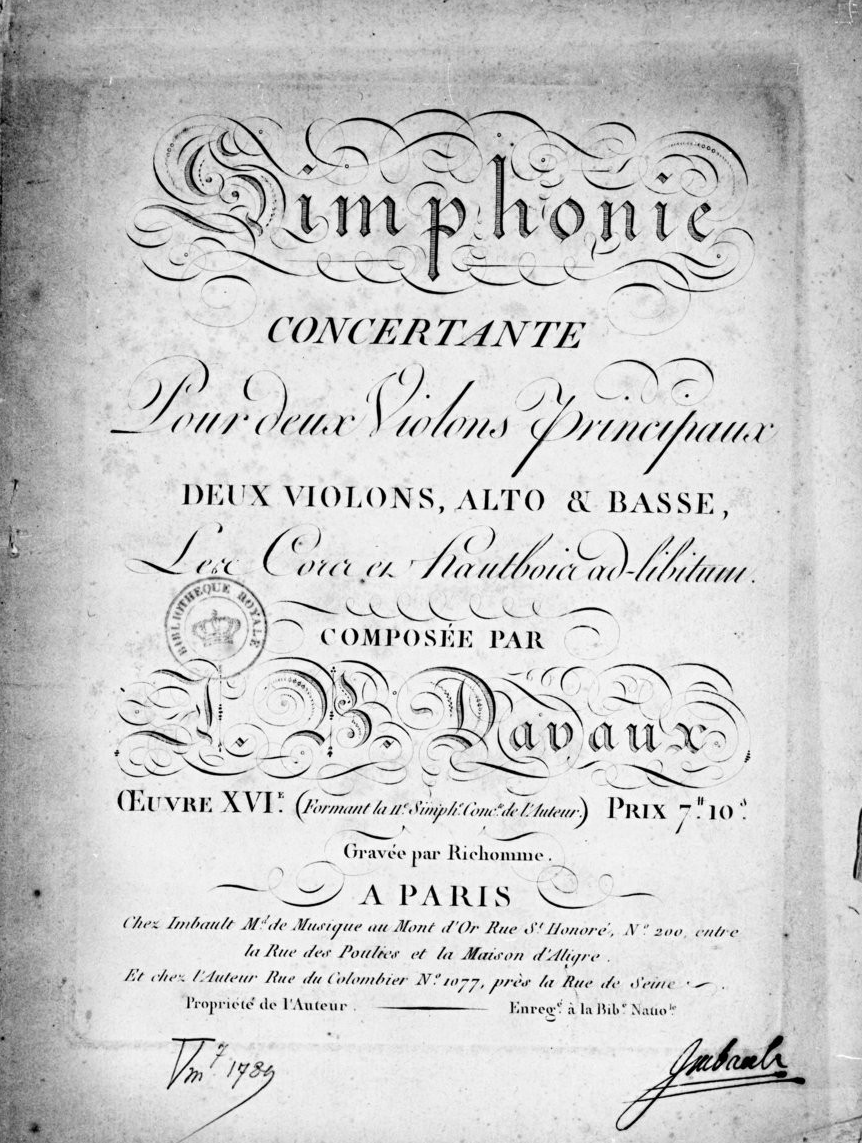
Title page of the Symphonie concertante, Op. 16, by Jean-Baptiste Davaux (Paris, 1800, éd. Imault)

Davaux mainly composed instrumental music. He is known for his thirteen Symphonies concertantes (between 1772 and 1800) which are one of the best successes of the genre. One of them, titled "SINFONIE CONCERTANTE mélée d’Airs Patriotiques" from 1794 and without opus number, is punctuated with patriotic songs such as La Marseillaise and Ça ira.

His other works include 25 String quartets which are an important contribution to the history of the genre. Each (except one of opus 9) being a two-movement cut-out: one in sonata form, followed by a rondo or presto.

His other chamber music pieces consist of six duets, six trios and four quintets. He also wrote symphonies, arias and a violin concerto.

His compositions have a simple style, but effective, corresponding to the taste of the time.

== Discography ==
- The Prise de la Bastille, Music of the French Revolution: Symphonie concertante for two main violins, mingled with patriotic Airs - Concerto Köln (Capriccio 10280)

== Bibliography ==
- Brook, Barry S.; Kolk, Joel; Foster, Donald H. (2001). "Davaux [Davau, D'Avaux], Jean-Baptiste". In Sadie, Stanley; Tyrrell, John (eds.). The New Grove Dictionary of Music and Musicians (2nd ed.). London: Macmillan. ISBN 978-1-56159-239-5.
- F.M. Grimm, Correspondence littéraire, philosophique et critique (Paris, 1812–14)
- C. Pierre, Histoire du Concert Spirituel, 1725–1790 (Paris, 1975)
- P. Oboussier, The French String Quartet, 1770–1800, Music and the French Revolution, ed. M. Boyd (Cambridge, 1992), p. 74–92
