= Jean-Baptiste Venier =

18th-century Parisian violinist and publisher

Jean-Baptiste Venier was an 18th-century Parisian violinist and music publisher, active from 1750 to 1782.

== Biography ==
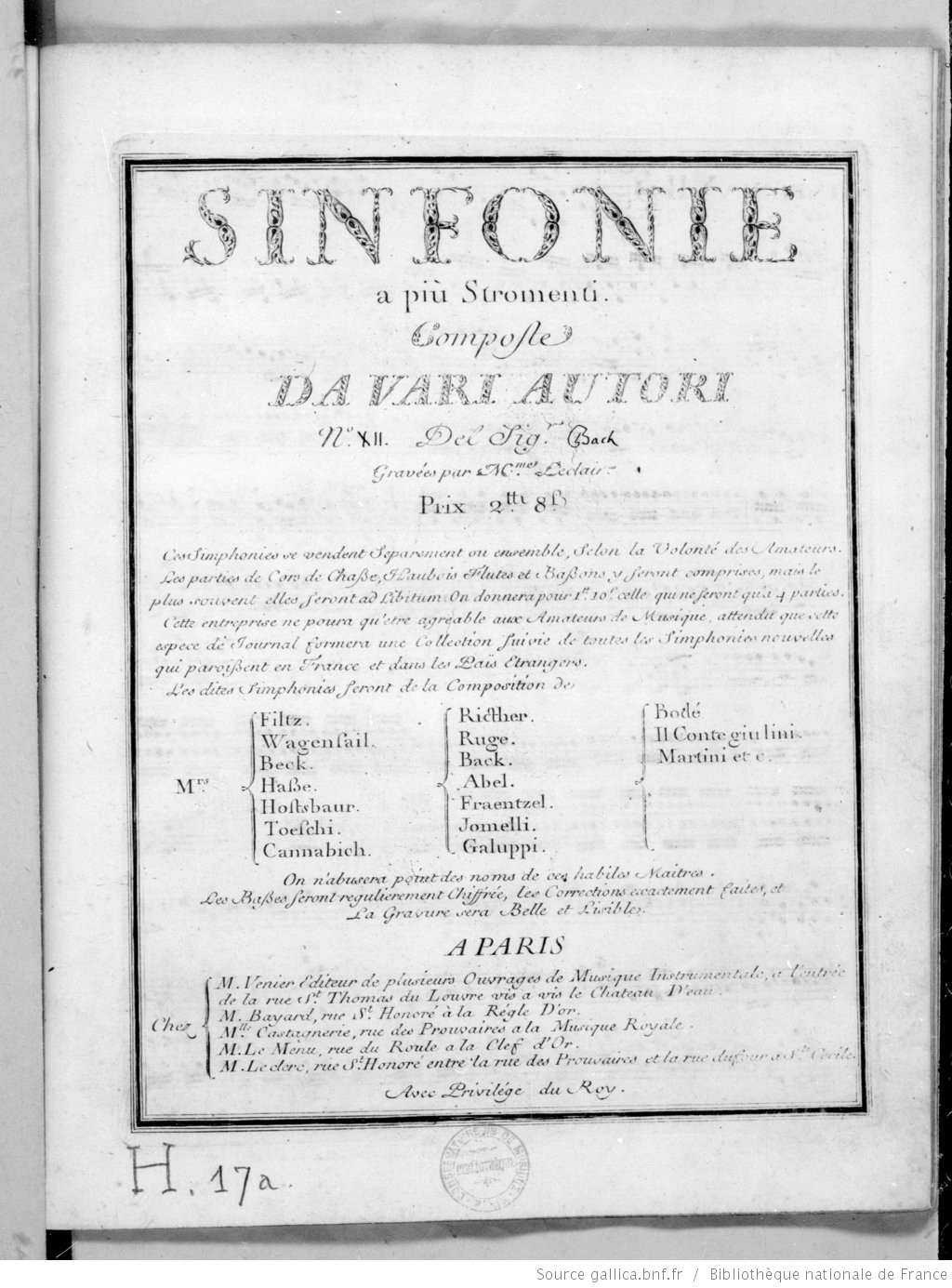
Title page of the series symphonies a più strumenti. Note that the page is common for all numbers: the attribution to Johann Christian Bach is added manually with the number of the collection, XII (Venier, 1762).

Giovanni Battista Venier, Frenchified as Jean-Baptiste, of Venetian origin, moved to Paris in the 1750s. As a violinist, he performed at the Concert Spirituel and taught violin until 1782. He obtained a royal privilege for music publishing in 1755 and held until 1782, eventually selling his business to publisher Charles-Georges Boyer in 1784.

First he had no shop but in 1760, his cabinet was located rue Saint-Thomas-du-Louvre, vis-à-vis Château d'Eau. After September 1778, he settled rue Traversière-Saint-Honoré to no longer move.

Venier published many important works, focused exclusively on instrumental music, whether symphonies, concertos and chamber music. He published in particular a series of Sinfonie da varii autori, publishing many authors as we can see from the title pages of these editions. From 1757 or 1758, these symphonies were released by way of periodic, as did his colleagues Huberty and La Chevardière and sometimes in combination, but briefly.

Among the composers, the Italians were Giovanni Battista Sammartini, Gaetano Pugnani, Luigi Boccherini, of whom he gave the Opp. 2, and 4 to 9; between 1767 and 1772, the Germans, Viennese and the Bohemians were Johann Christian Bach, Haydn (including his Symphony No. 22, Der Philosoph with its adagio published en 1773), and others such as Filtz, Christian Joseph Lidarti, Franz Ignaz Beck, Florian Leopold Gassmann, Wagenseil, Ignaz Fränzl, Dittersdorf and Karl Joseph Toeschi, Valentin Roeser, Josef Mysliveček and Antonín Kammel... Pieter van Maldere; Gossec (Symphonies Op. 12) was among the French composers published by Venier.

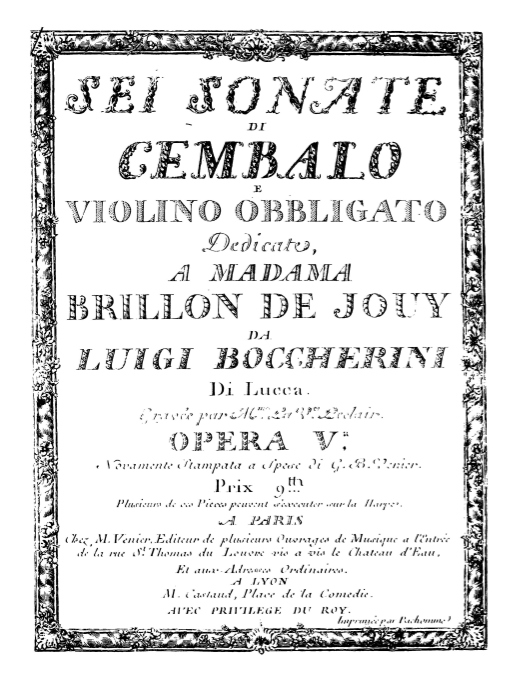
Title page of Boccherini's Six Sonatas, Op. 5 (Venier, 1769)
