= Jean-Jacques Grasset =

French classical violinist and composer (c. 1769–1839)

- Born: c. 1769; Paris, France
- Died: 25 August 1839 (aged 69–70)
- Occupations: Violinist; composer
- Years active: 1800–1829
- Employers: Conservatoire de Paris; The Théâtre-Italien in the 19th century
- Style: Classical

Jean-Jacques Grasset (c. 1769 – 25 August 1839) was a French classical violinist and composer.

He was born in Paris about 1769, and was a pupil of Isidore Bertheaume. After several years' obligatory service in the army, he soon became well-known on his return. On the death of Pierre Gaviniès in 1800, he was appointed professor of the violin at the Conservatoire de Paris. Soon afterwards, he succeeded Antonio Bartolomeo Bruni as chef d'orchestre at the Italian Opera, holding the post until 1829, when he retired from public life. He died in Paris in 1839.

He published three Concertos for the Violin, five books of Violin-Duos, and a Sonata for Piano and Violin.
