= Kuivalainen =

Kuivalainen is a Finnish surname. Notable people with the surname include:

- Kari Kuivalainen (born 1961), Finnish singer-songwriter
- Mateli Magdalena Kuivalatar (née Kuivalainen, 1777–1846), Finnish folk singer
- Pasi Kuivalainen (born 1972), Finnish ice hockey goaltender
- Sandhja Kuivalainen (born 1991), Finnish singer
