= Antoine Huberty =

French musician and engraver (c. 1722 – 1791)

- Born: c. 1722
- Died: 13 January 1791 (aged 68–69)
- Other names: Anton Huberty, Antoine Huberti
- Occupations: Musician; music publisher; engraver
- Years active: 1756–1790s
- Musical career
- Genres: Classical; opera
- Instrument: Viola d'amore

Antoine Huberty (c. 1722 – 13 January 1791) was a French musician, music publisher and engraver of Flemish origin who practiced in Paris and later in Vienna in the second half of the 18th century. His name is sometimes spelled Anton Huberty or Antoine Huberti.

== Life ==
Huberty worked in Paris from 1756 as a musician at the opera and as a viola d'amore player, but he remains better known for his activities as an engraver and music publisher.

His first publications date from 1756, with works by Wagenseil. Between 1758 and 1760, he was briefly associated with La Chevardière, another important Parisian publisher. His signs and successive addresses were rue du Roule: A la Croix d'or; rue de l'Arbre-Sec, rue du Chantre: A l'Hôtel Saint-Esprit; and rue des Deux-Écus: Au Pigeon blanc. In Paris, in addition to Wagenseil, Huberty published Holzbauer, Wanhal, Benda, Franz Asplmayr, Zappa, Anton Fils, Pugnani, Sammartini, and others.

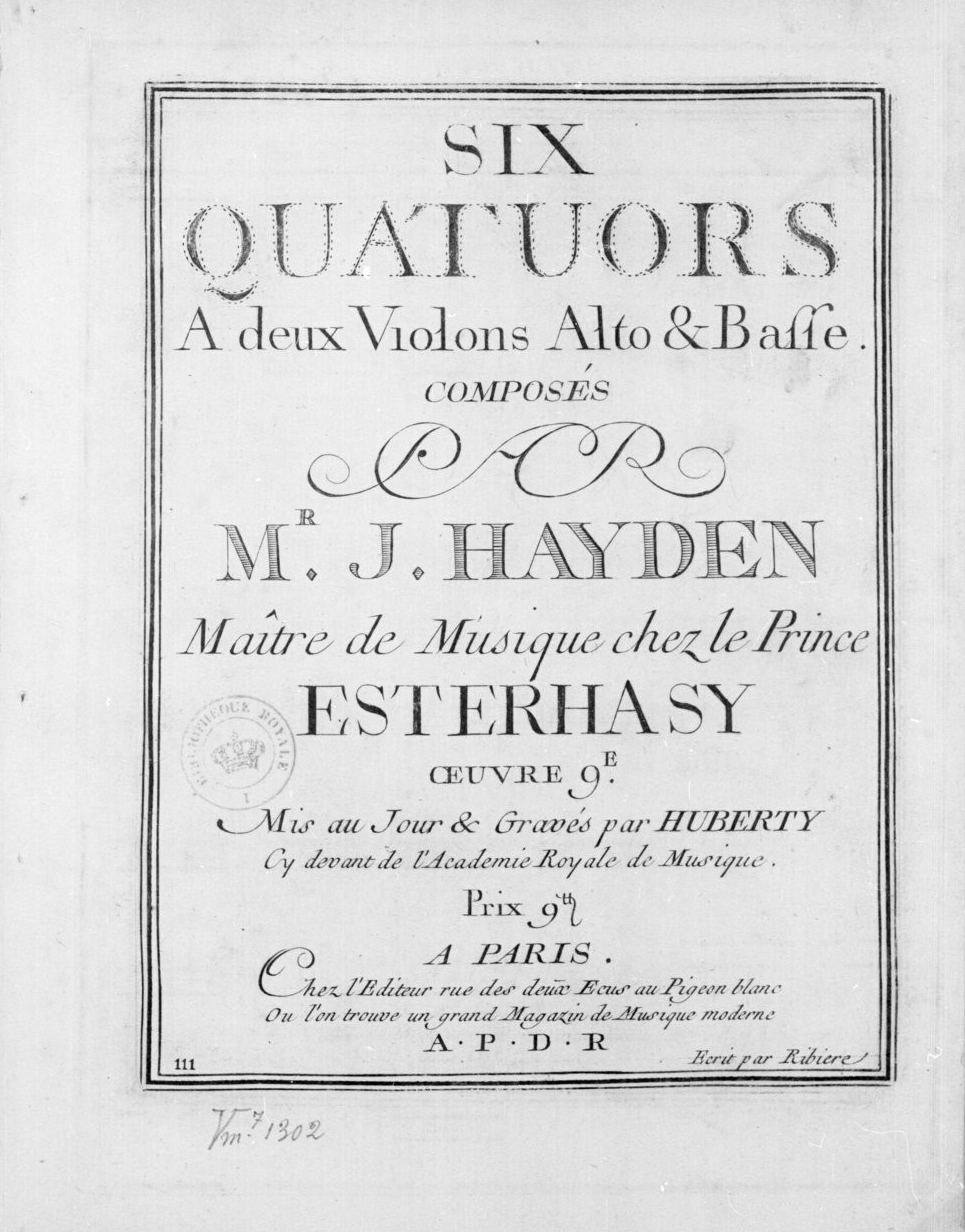
Title page of the string quartets, Opus 9, by Joseph Haydn (Paris, 1772)

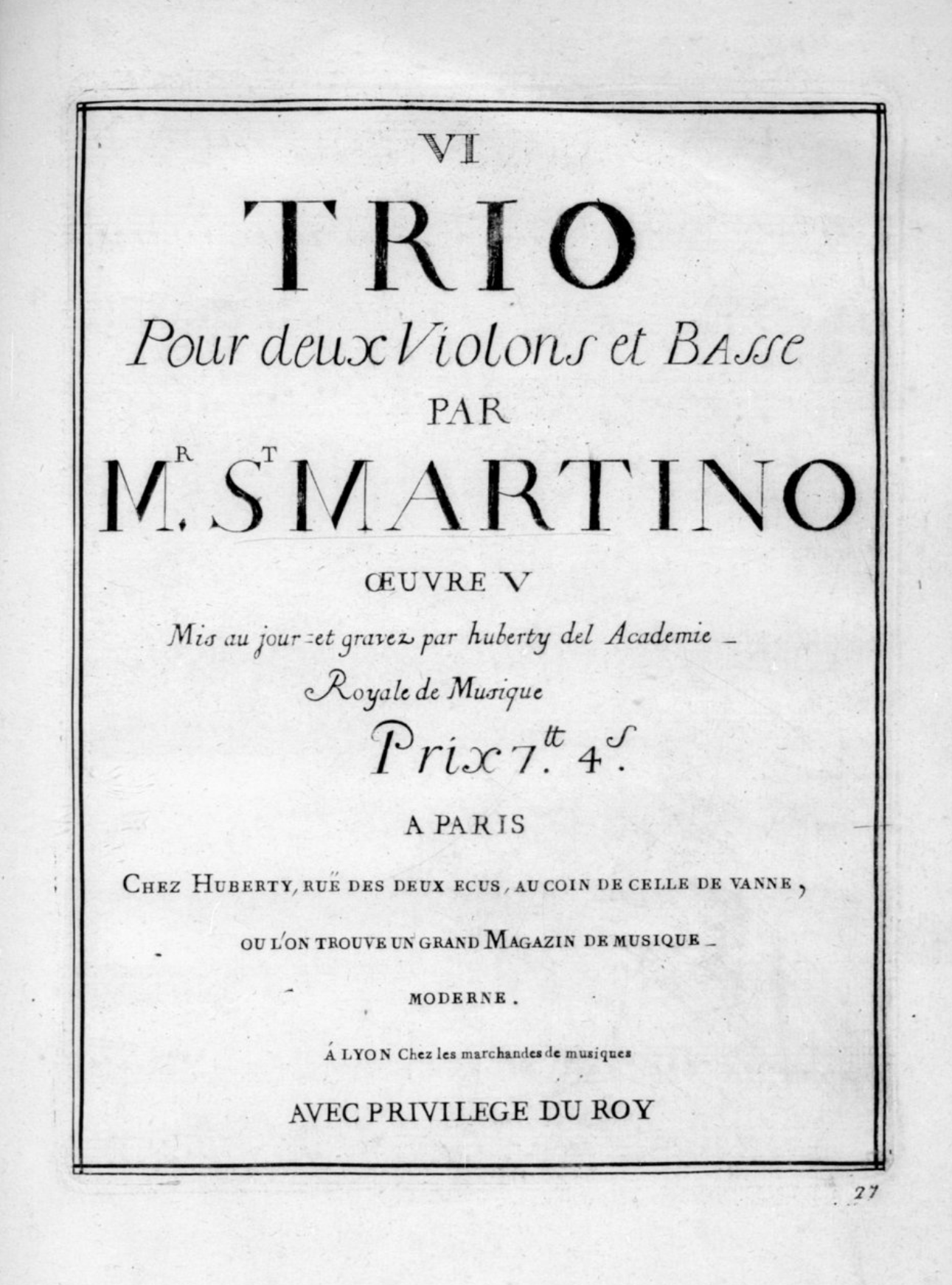
Title page of the "6 Trios", Opus 7, for 2 violins and double bass, by Sammartini, Huberty edition (Paris, s.d.)

At some point, he was convinced to move to Vienna, where copper engraving was little practiced at the time. He momentarily sold his shop to the publisher Jean-Georges Sieber in 1771.

Huberty and his family moved to Vienna at the beginning of 1777, where he established his company in Alstergasse under the sign Zum goldenen Hirschen [The golden deer]. However, unable to rival the competition from Torricella and Artaria, he did not open his own shop and rather worked for them: from 1781, he engraved for Torricella, and later, increasingly for Artaria and other publishers. His engraving work is recognizable even without his mark, "Huberty sculps".

At the end of his life, Huberty was reduced to abject poverty and worked only on the technique of engraving plates that were used by Artaria, Hoffmeister and Kozeluch.

== Bibliography ==
- Alexander Weinmann, Kataloge Anton Huberty (Wien) und Christoph Torricella. Vienne, Universal Edition 1962, p. 1–88 OCLC 1203393
- Weinmann, Alexander (2001). "Huberty, Anton (Huberti, Antoine)". In Stanley Sadie (ed.). The new Grove dictionary of music and musicians (2nd ed.). New York: Grove. doi:10.1093/gmo/9781561592630.article.13473. ISBN 9780195170672.

== See also ==
- Répertoire International des Sources Musicales
