= Giovanni Morandi =

Giovanni Morandi may refer to:

- Giovanni Maria Morandi (1622–1717), Italian painter
- Giovanni Morandi (composer) (1777–1856), Romantic Italian organist and composer
