= Quatuor concertant =

The quatuor concertant is a special form of string quartet that developed in Paris around 1775 and became one of the leading genres of Parisian music until the French Revolution.

== Name ==
The name "quatuor concertant" appears often in the scores of string quartets published in Paris, not always corresponding to the characteristics below. While the term initially was simply used to highlight the soloistic character of the piece, from around 1776 on it is mainly used for string quartets in which the different voices alternately take the leading role.

== Characteristics ==
The quatuors concertants are generally two movements, or rarely three movements. The two-movement works usually consist of an Allegro for the first movement and a Rondo or Theme and variations for the second. The three-movement pieces usually have a slower movement in the middle before a presto finale.

Characteristic of the quatuor concertants are the alternating solos in the different voices, sometimes including the cello, catchy, often operatic, melodies, and a great ingenuity in harmonic, rhythmic, and melodic detail. There are clear parallels to the sinfonie concertante which was popular at the same time.

A special form is the Quatuor d'airs connus, which is based on the variation of a popular melody, derived either from folksong or from an opera aria.

The quatuor concertants should be distinguished from the Quatuor brillant that became popular around 1800, and in which the first violin dominates to the accompaniment of the other three voices.

== Important composers of string quartets in Paris, 1770–1789 ==
- François-Joseph Gossec (6 string quartets, Op.15, 1772)
- Nicholas Joseph Chartrain (36 string quartets, 1772–1785)
- Pierre Vachon (24 string quartets, ca. 1772 – ca. 1782)
- Joseph Bologne, Chevalier de Saint-Georges (18 string quartets, 1773–1785)
- Jean-Baptiste Davaux (25 string quartets, 1773–1807)
- Giuseppe Cambini (174 quartets, 1773–1805, including one with flute)
- Etienne Bernard Barrière (18 string quartets, 1776–1782)
- Jean-Baptiste Bréval (18 string quartets, 1776–1785)
- Nicolas Dalayrac (36 string quartets, 1777–1781)
- Josephus Fodor (24 string quartets, 1781–1789)
- Giovanni Battista Viotti (15 string quartets, 1783–1817)
- Federigo Fiorillo (15 string quartets, 1786–1799)
