= Alexandre Lachevardière =

Alexandre Lachevardière (1795 in Sucy-en-Brie – 6 May 1855 in Paris) was a French bookseller and printer-publisher of the 19th century.

== Biography ==
The son of Alexandre-Louis Lachevardière (1765–1828) and grandson of Parisian music publisher Louis-Balthazar de La Chevardière or Lachevardière (1730–1812), he directed Louis-Toussaint Cellot's printing company (1822) and got his printer's license 9 December 1823. He then took over the Cellot printing.

One of the introducers of mechanical presses in France, in 1824 he financially participated with Pierre Leroux to the founding of the newspaper Le Globe and in 1833 to that of Le Magasin pittoresque. His printing became one of the largest of Paris, employing the most workers and presses in the capital. He is famous for having published numerous Saint-Simonists.

In 1830, he lost many of his printing presses during the July Revolution. The government then made a loan of 60,000 francs.

Among his many impressions, the best known are the Nouveau dictionnaire historique des environs de Paris, published in 1825 and the fourteen volumes of Histoire d'Angleterre, depuis la première invasion des Romains by English historian John Lingard.

== Work ==
- Spécimen des caractères de l'imprimerie de Lachevardière fils (1826)

== Bibliography ==
- Jean-Jacques Goblot, Le Globe, 1824-1830, Honoré Champion, 1993, p. 264
