= Louis-Balthazar de La Chevardière =

French music publisher

Louis-Balthazar de La Chevardière (February 1730 in Volx – 8 April 1812 in Verrières-le-Buisson) was a French music publisher in the second half of the 18th century.

== Biography ==
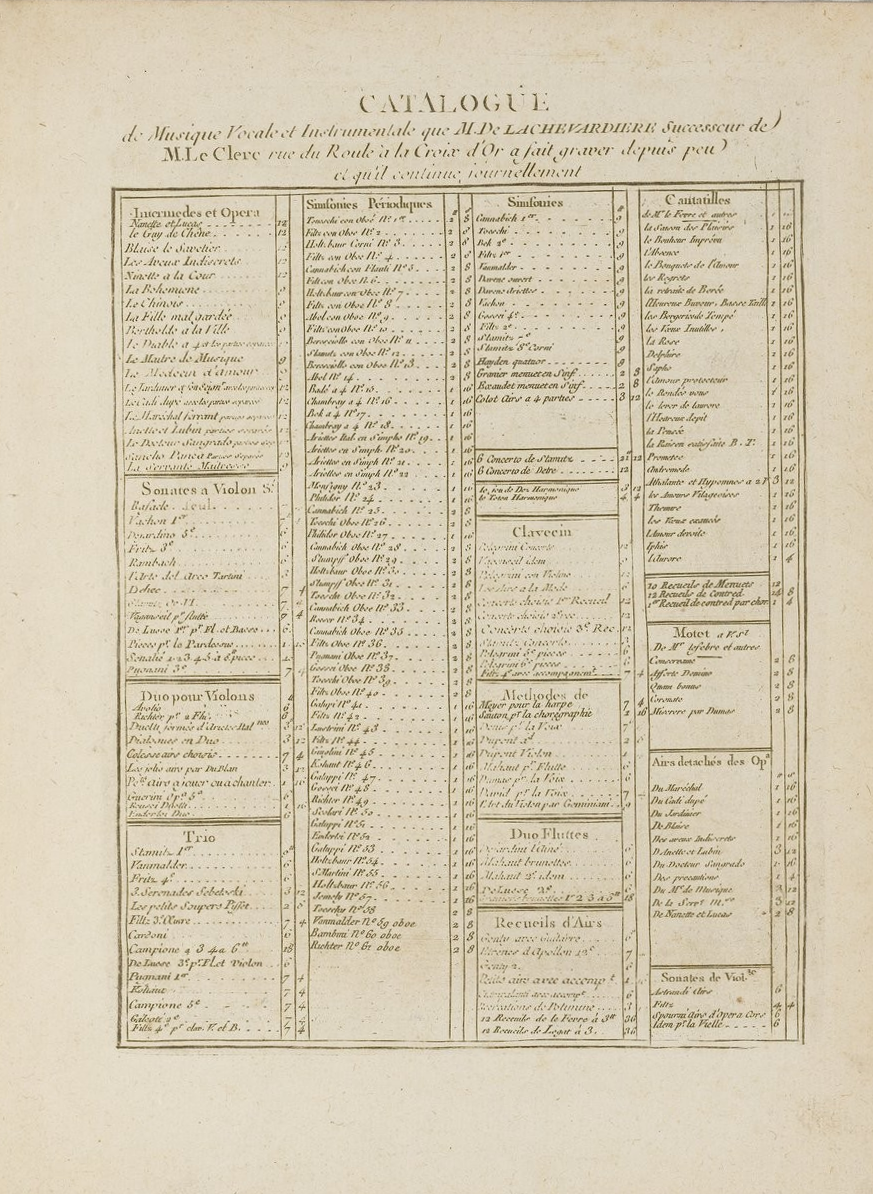
La Chevardière's catalog in 1764, second page of Six Simphonies ou quatuors dialogués (Hob. III : 1 à 6) by Joseph Haydn – funds BnF.

The publishing activities of the Chevardière were announced in several periodicals in October 1758. He first took over the company that Jean-Pantaléon Le Clerc had passed to his daughter, Madame Vernadé. And indeed, in December 1758. The Chevardière designated himself as "successor to Mr. Le Clerc." He briefly associated with Huberty (1722-1791), whose name appeared jointly on some 1759 scores: Paris, de La Chevardière et Huberti, successeurs de M. Leclerc. But until 1780, La Chevardière worked alone. In February 1780, he entrusted the management of the shop to his daughter, Elisabeth Éléonore and his step-son Jean-Pierre Deroullède for three years. On 1 December 1784, he sold the company to Pierre Leduc (1755–1818) – the brother of composer Simon Le Duc – and retired in Verrières-le-Buisson where he became mayor of the city (1790).

La Chevardière demonstrated great versatility in his publications consisting of both "fashionable" easy music (dances, ballads, songs and arias from operas) and "serious" scores of chamber music, symphonies, sacred music and even treaties. In this area, his catalog included Haydn, Johann Christian Bach, Carl and Anton Stamitz, Toeschi, Cannabich, Locatelli, Boccherini, Jommelli, Pergolesi, Gossec, Grétry, Philidor, Monsigny

His son, Alexandre-Louis Lachevardière (1765–1828), was a jacobin activist, then a senior official who had a son, Alexandre Lachevardière (1795–1855), an editor and bookseller.

== Bibliography ==
- Michel Brenet, « Les débuts de l’abonnement musical », Mercure musical, ii (1906), (p. 256-273) OCLC 843350862
- Devriès, Anik (2001). "La Chevardière, Louis Balthazard de". The New Grove Dictionary of Music and Musicians. London: Macmillan. doi:10.1093/gmo/9781561592630.article.15777.

== See also ==
- Répertoire international des sources musicales
