= Jean-Georges Sieber =

Jean-Georges Sieber (2 February 1738 in Reiterswiesen, Bad Kissingen – 13 January 1822 in Paris) was a German born French musician and music publisher.

== Biography ==
According to François-Joseph Fétis, Sieber arrived in Paris in 1758 and became a French horn player in the académie royale de musique orchestra and at the Concert spirituel. At the same time he taught the harp to the residents of the Pentemont Abbey. He began his publishing activities in 1770 after he married Marie-Julie Regnault, who was trained at music engraving.

Initially, he published mostly composers of German origin, including Johann Christian Bach, Dittersdorf, Anton Fils, Carl Stamitz, Ernst Eichner, Johann Baptist Wanhal or Joseph Haydn (with over 50 symphonies and numerous chamber works), Mozart (Symphony No. 31 K. 297 better known as the "Paris Symphony"), the first edition of the sonatas for piano and violin K. 301-306 in 1778). Subsequently, he published many pieces of Parisian composers of the time, composers of the Mannheim school and Italian masters such as Felice Giardini, Luigi Boccherini, Giovanni Battista Viotti, Carlo Tessarini, Gaetano Pugnani, Giovanni Punto and Federigo Fiorillo. In 1822, the year of his death at age 83, Sieber catalog had about 2,000 works, both instrumental and lyrical.

His son Georges-Julien (1775-1847) first worked with his parents, then independently from 1799 before merging the two publishing houses in 1824.

== See also ==
- Répertoire international des sources musicales
