= Isidore Bertheaume =

French classical composer and violinist

Isidore (or Julien) Bertheaume (ca. 1752 – 20 March 1802) was a French classical composer and violinist.

== Biography ==
Born in Paris, Bertheaume was a child prodigy. He was the nephew of violinist Jacques Lemière the eldest (who died in 1771). According to the Mercure de France of April 1761, at the age of nine and a half, he obtained great success at the Concert Spirituel with a sonata by Lemière and another by Felice Giardini. In 1767, he joined the Orchestra of the Paris Opera and became its first violin in 1774.

Then in 1788, he was appointed concertmaster of the Opéra-Comique orchestra. Between 1788 and 1791, he conducted the orchestra of the Concert Spirituel. In 1791 Bertheaume left France and held several posts in northern Germany until 1801. Via Copenhagen and Stockholm he emigrated to Russia, where he became first violin in Tsar Alexander I's court orchestra. He died a few months after arriving at St-Petersburg.

Bertheaume was a rival of Giovanni Battista Viotti in Paris and was considered an outstanding virtuoso, although not quite of Viotti's caliber. His compositions are ideally written for the violin and were highly regarded by his contemporaries. After the performance of his two Symphonies Concertantes in 1786, the critic of the Mercure de France reported that the audience had warmly received both the composition and its interpretation by the composer and his pupil Jean-Jacques Grasset.

His concertos are quite simply constructed, yet allow for a comprehensive display of the soloist's virtuosity. The Sonata Op. 2, composed "dans le style de Lolly," and the second sonata of Op. 4 are notable for their use of the scordatura, which was rather unusual at this late period.

Among Bertheaume's numerous pupils were Antonio Bartolomeo Bruni, Antoine Lacroix (1756–1806), Jean-Jacques Grasset and his nephew Charles Philippe Lafont.

== Works ==
- Six sonates à violon seul et basse continue (1769)
- 2 Sonatas for 2 Violins, Op.2
- 6 Violin Duos, Op.3
- Deux concertos pour le violon Op. 5 (1786)
- Deux symphonies concertantes pour deux violons et alto Op. 6 (1787)
- Trois sonates pour le clavecin ou Piano-forte avec accompagnement de violon Op. 7 (1787)

== Bibliography ==
- Benoit, Marcelle (1992). Dictionnaire de la musique en France aux XVIIe et XVIIIe siècles (in French). Paris: Fayard. p. 68. ISBN 978-2-213-02824-8.
- François-Joseph Fétis, Biographie universelle des musiciens et bibliographie générale de la musique (1863)
