= Luigi de Baillou =

Italian violinist and composer

Pietro Luigi Francesco de Baillou (27 July 1736 – 14 March 1804) also known with the French form Louis de Baylou, was an Italian violinist and composer. A concertmaster and conductor at La Scala for 23 years, his musical production consisted mainly of ballets represented in Milan and in other major theatres.

== Life ==
Biographical information on Baillou is fragmentary. Born in Milan from Francesco Baillou, he probably studied violin under the guidance of Nicolas Capron in Paris. From 1762, he lived in Stuttgart, where he worked in the court orchestra of the Duke of Württemberg, of which he became concertmaster in 1771. Dismissed in 1774, he moved to Milan, where he dwelled till his death.

Most of his compositive output dates after his return to Italy, and only a handful compositions of doubtful attribution date back to his permanence in Germany. His main genre was ballet, nevertheless it is hard to formulate a judgment on the quality of his production, since most of his music did not survive and few critic judgments from his era are known. Between 1775 and 1777, he wrote six ballets, and in 1778, two ballets for the Teatro Comunale in Florence and one opera for Stuttgart.

In 1779, he became concertmaster and director at Teatro alla Scala, position he maintained for 23 years. Between 1783 and 1788, he wrote seven ballets for La Scala, and in the same period he was also concertmaster at the Pio Istituto de' Professori di Musica. In 1797, under the French occupation, he wrote a ballet of republican inspiration. In 1802, he was arbiter in a controversy between the theatre management and the orchestra. In 1803, he left his position at La Scala, where he was replaced by Alessandro Rolla. Baillou died in Milan in 1804 and was buried in Cimitero di San Gregorio, demolished in the end of XIX century. His last ballet, La disfatta di Abderamo, was premiered posthumous in 1809. Several of his children and grandchildren became musicians and worked at La Scala.

Apart from ballets, Baillou wrote five symphonies and an orchestral ouverture of fairly simple style, a duo and five trios for violins of elementary difficulty, most likely intended as didactic material, and two didactic books on arpeggios and solfège.

== Bibliography ==
- Forcella, Vincenzo (1889). Iscrizioni delle chiese e degli altri edifici di Milano dal secolo VIII ai giorni nostri. Vol. V. Milano: Tip. Bortolotti di G. Prato. p. 12 – via archive.org.
- Grigolato, Gilda (2016). "Baillou, Luigi de". Die Musik in Geschichte und Gegenwart. Kassel, Stuttgart, New York: Laurenz Lütteken.
- Kuzmick, Hansell Kathleen; Bellora, Carlo (2001). "Baillou, Luigi de". Grove Music Online (8th ed.). Oxford University Press. doi:10.1093/gmo/9781561592630.article.01798. ISBN 978-1-56159-263-0. (subscription, Wikilibrary access, or UK public library membership required)
- Romani, Luigi (1862). Teatro alla Scala. Cronologia di tutti gli spettacoli rappresentati in questo teatro dal giorno del solenne suo aprimento sino ad oggi, con introduzione ed annotazioni. Milano: Giacomo Pirola – via archive.org.
- Sadie, Stanley, ed. (1980). "Baillou, Luigi de". The New Grove Dictionary of Music and Musicians. Vol. 2 (1st ed.). London: Macmillan. p. 37.
