= Symphony No. 31 (Mozart) =

1778 symphony by W. A. Mozart

- Paris
- by W. A. Mozart
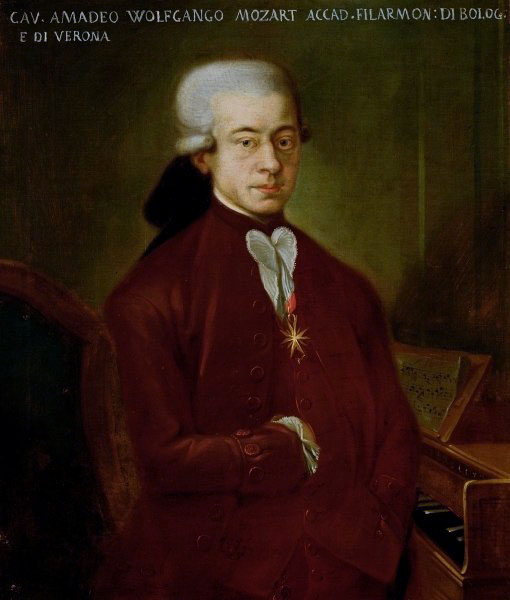
- Mozart in 1777, wearing the Papal Order of the Golden Spur
- Key: D major
- Catalogue: K. 297/300a
- Style: Classical period
- Composed: 1778
- Dedication: Joseph Legros
- Performed: 12 June 1778
- Published: 1779
- Movements: 3

The Symphony No. 31 in D major, K. 297/300a, better known as the Paris Symphony, is a symphony by Wolfgang Amadeus Mozart. It may have been first of his symphonies to be published when Jean-Georges Sieber released their edition in 1779.

The autograph manuscript of the symphony (with that of the alternative middle movement) are preserved in the Berlin State Library.

== Composition and premiere ==
The work was composed in 1778 during Mozart's unsuccessful job-hunting sojourn in Paris when he was 22 years old. The work was composed for Joseph Legros, an opera singer and impresario, who was director of the Concert Spirituel.

The premiere took place on 12 June 1778 in a private performance in the home of Count Karl Heinrich Joseph von Sickingen, the ambassador of the Electorate of the Palatinate. The public premiere took place six days later in a performance at the Concert Spirituel.

The work received a positive review in the June 26 issue of the Courrier de l'Europe, published in London:

The Concert Spirituel on Corpus Christi Day began with a symphony by M. Mozart. This artist, who from the tenderest age made a name for himself among harpsichord players, may today be ranked among the most able composers. (Note: Original in French.)

The work was performed again at the Concert Spirituel on 15 August, this time with a new second movement, an Andante replacing the original Andantino in 6/8 (the latter, according to Deutsch, "had failed to please".)

The work evidently was popular. Deutsch lists several further performances at the Concert Spirituel during 1779, on 18 and 23 March, 23 May, and 3 June; and on 14 May 1780 The work was published in Paris by Sieber and announced for sale 20 February 1779. During the years 1782 to 1788, Sieber's catalog described it as "in the repertoire of the Concert Spirituel".

The symphony was later performed in the Burgtheater in Vienna on 11 March 1783 during a benefit concert for Mozart's sister-in-law, the singer Aloysia Weber.

== Instrumentation ==
The symphony is notable for having an unusually large instrumentation for its time, made possible by the large orchestra available to Mozart during his time in Paris. There are 2 flutes, 2 oboes, 2 clarinets in A, 2 bassoons, 2 horns, 2 trumpets, timpani, and strings. It was Mozart's first symphony to use clarinets.

Sadie remarks that this is the largest orchestra for which Mozart had yet composed in his career. The number of string players is (as usual) not specified in the score, but Sadie remarks that at the premiere there were 22 violins, five violas, eight cellos, and five double basses. He adds, "[Mozart's father] Leopold remarked that, to judge by the Parisian symphonies he had seen, the French must like noisy symphonies."

== The music ==
The symphony is laid out in fast-slow-fast form, omitting the minuet normally found in classical-era symphonies:

1. Allegro assai,, in D major
2. Andante, 6/8 (earlier as Andantino, 3/4), in G major
3. Allegro,, in D major

The first movement opens with a rising and accelerating D major scale in an effect known at the time as the Mannheim Rocket.

Both second movements still exist, as does a sketch of an earlier longer version of the Andantino.

== Critical comment ==
Sadie notes, reflecting on Leopold's remark given above, that indeed "Mozart's Paris Symphony is quite noisy. It has vigorous, stirring tuttis, with a lively violin line and an active line for the basses, lending the music extra animation. The actual thematic matter is relatively conventional, more a matter of figures than melodies, but there is not development as such, and most of the working-out of ideas comes at their presentation."
