= Charles-Georges Boyer =

French music publisher (1743–1806/7)

Charles-Georges Boyer (1743 in Paris – 1806 or 1807 in Paris) was an 18th-century French music publisher.

== Biography ==
Boyer was écuyer du Roi when he married Marie-Rose Le Menu in February 1775. In January 1778, his wife joined with her mother Roze Menu in their music publishing company, under the sign "À la clef d'or". The business had been established by Christophe Le Menu in 1758. The association Dames Lemenu et Boyer ended in 1783. That same year, Boyer took over his stepmother's company, after he had invested in the business as soon as 21 January 1779.

The catalogues issued under his name merged works previously published by Madame Le Menu. In 1784, Boyer bought the business of publisher Jean-Baptiste Venier.

His various addresses in Paris from 1778 to 1796 were rue du Roule (1778–83); rue Neuve-des-petits-Champs (1783–85); rue de Richelieu (1785–93) or rue de la Loi (1793–96, because of name changes during the Revolution), in the former café Foy.

In 1796, he sold his business to publisher Jean-Henri Naderman who presented himself as his successor and kept the sign "À la clef d'or" rue de la Loi.

Boyer's repertory encompassed all that was fashionable: symphonies, sinfonia concertante, concertos, chamber music and less serious pieces such as arrangements to opéra comiques and popular tunes. His catalog included Italian composers Boccherini, Cambini, Clementi, Lorenziti and Sarti; German ones, such as Haydn, Stamitz, Wanhal, Kreutzer, Leopold Koželuch and Sterkel. In contrast, French composers were minority

== Bibliography ==
- Anik Devriès (2001). The New Grove Dictionary of Music and Musicians (edited by Stanley Sadie); Boyer, Charles-Georges. London: Macmillan. p. 25000. ISBN 978-0-19-517067-2.
