= János Fusz =

Hungarian composer

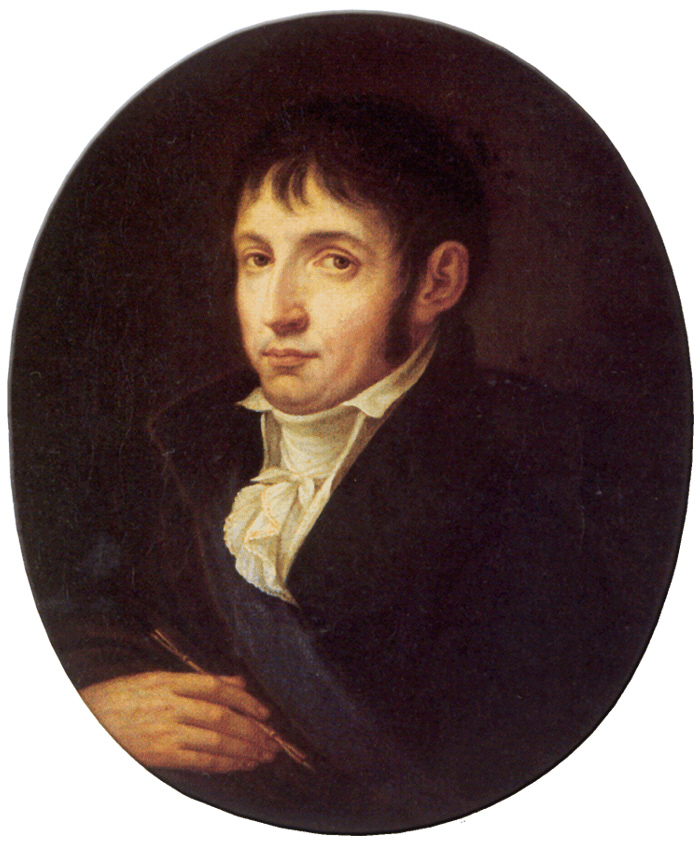
János Fusz.

János Fusz (Johann Evangelist Fuss) (15 June, baptised on the 16th 1777 in Tolna, Hungary – 9 March 1819), aged 41, was a Hungarian composer. Although he composed in many different genres, he was highly popular during his lifetime for his many songs, earning recognition from Beethoven among others.

He also composed a Quartet for flute, viola, cello and guitar.

== Recordings ==
- German songs – Maria Zadori (soprano) Timothy Bentch (tenor), accompanied by Aniko Horvath on fortepiano, Hungaroton 2006
