= Nicolas Capron =

French classical violinist and composer

Nicolas Capron (ca. 1740 – 14 September 1784) was a French classical violinist and composer.

== Biography ==
Nicolas Capron was a student of Pierre Gaviniès and one of the most famous French violinists of his time. His career began in 1756 at the Opéra-Comique and in the private orchestra of the general farmer, Alexandre Le Riche de La Pouplinière. From 1765, he became concertmaster at the Concert Spirituel. Capron attended the most important musical fairs of the city where he met renowned musicians, philosophers and writers. In addition to being a virtuoso, Capron was an appreciated teacher, and among his students were Marie-Alexandre Guénin and Mlle Deschamps, known as a child prodigy, who at the age of 11 played two violin concertos at the Concert spirituel. Nicolas Capron was a member of the Masonic lodge Société Académique des Enfants d'Apollon.

== Works ==
Capron composed mainly works for his instrument and appears next to François-Joseph Gossec and Pierre Vachon among the creators in France of the string quartet. In his compositions he generally uses the three-movement structure, the use of a double theme in the early Allegros movements; he also uses the appoggiaturas in the style of the Mannheim School. He is one of the first French violinists who used the mute.

- First Book of Sonatas for Solo and Bass Violin Op. 1 (1768)
- Sei quartetti Op. 2 (1772), dédiés au Duc de Laval
- Six Duos for 2 violins Op. 3 (1777)
- Two concertos for violin, Op.2
- several violin concertos, now missing

== Bibliography ==
- dir Marcelle Benoit, Dictionnaire de la musique en France aux XVIIe et XVIIIe siècles, Fayard, 1992, ISBN 2-213-02824-9
