= Sammartini =

Sammartini is a surname, and may refer to the brothers

- Giovanni Battista Sammartini (c.1700–1775), Italian composer and oboist, younger brother of Giuseppe
- Giuseppe Sammartini (1695–1750), Italian composer and oboist, older brother of Giovanni
