= John Keeble (composer) =

John Keeble (1711 – 24 December 1786) was an English organist, composer and writer on music.

== Life ==
Keeble was born in 1711 in Chichester, and was chorister at Chichester Cathedral under Thomas Kelway. In 1734–1735 Keeble, with William Boyce, John Travers and others, attended Johann Christoph Pepusch's lectures, which gave him an enduring interest in Greek musical theory.

He was appointed in 1737 as organist of St George's, Hanover Square in London, successor to Thomas Roseingrave. Keeble was also organist at Ranelagh Gardens, from the opening in 1742. As a teacher of the harpsichord he had many pupils.

He married Hannah Painter in 1747, at St Botolph-without-Bishopsgate. Keeble died in 1786 at his house in Conduit Street, London, and was buried, according to his wish, at the parish church of Ramsholt in Suffolk, by the side of his wife.

== Works ==
- Select pieces for the organ or harpsichord: four sets of six pieces, 1777–1778.
- The Theory of Harmonics, or an Illustration of the Grecian Harmonica, 1784. Part i. deals with the systems of Euclid, Aristoxenus and Bacchius; part ii. with the doctrine of the Ratio, and the explanation of the two diagrams of the Gaudentius and the Pythagorean numbers in Nicomachus.
- Forty Interludes to be played between the verses of the Psalms, 1795: 25 are by Keeble and 15 by Jacob Kirkman, who succeeded him at St George's.
