= Antoine-Laurent Baudron =

French musician and composer

Antoine-Laurent Baudron (15 May 1742 – 23 September 1830), was a French musician and composer.

== Career ==
Born in Amiens, Baudron studied in the local Jesuit college and then moved to Paris to study the violin with Pierre Gaviniès.

In 1763 or 1764 he became a member of the orchestra of the Comédie Française where he became head violinist ("premier violon") in 1766. He soon began to write incidental music for the company's plays and was the first to write music to Beaumarchais's plays The Barber of Seville and The Marriage of Figaro.

Baudron is mainly remembered for having been the first to introduce instrumental interludes between the acts of a play that took up the mood of the scenes on the stage. These were realised at the Comédie Française from 1777 onwards. He also wrote the first known French string quartets (in 1768). He retired around 1822 and died in Paris.

== Bibliography ==
- Thomas Bauman and Marita McClymands: Opera and the Enlightenment (Cambridge: Cambridge University Press, 2006).
