= Federigo Fiorillo =

Italian composer

Federigo Fiorillo (baptized 1 June 1755 Brunswick, Germany, died after 1823) was a mandolinist and composer, who wrote thirty-six caprices for violin, also called études.

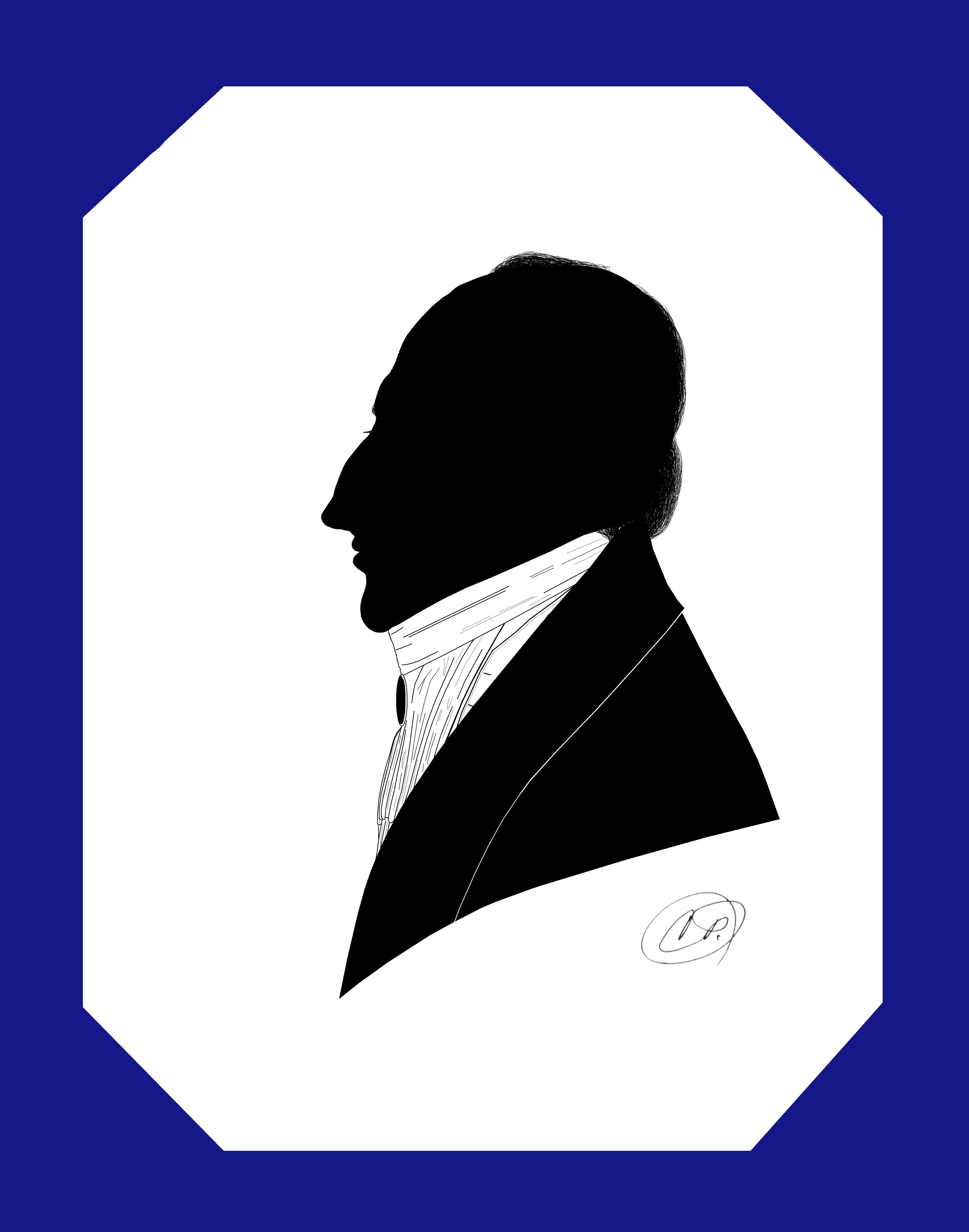
A Fiorillo 18th century style slhouette design by Carlos Fuentes y Espinosa

== Life and career ==
Fiorillo's father was Ignazio Fiorillo, a Neapolitan, who also played mandolin. At the beginning of the eighteenth century, Ignazio was appointed conductor at the Court Opera House at Brunswick and settled there, where his son, Federigo, was born. Federigo's early musical education was superintended by his father. He inherited his parents' love of the mandolin and obtained complete mastery over it, able to show mastery of delicate nuances of tone of which it was capable.

As a mandolinist, he performed at most of the royal courts of Europe, but the resources of the instrument at this period were limited, as was also the demand for mandolin players. He was compelled to devote his attention to other stringed instruments, principally the violin and viola. In 1780, he travelled to Poland, and in 1783, he was conductor of the band at Riga for two years. Two years later, he was playing the violin with success at the Concerts Spirituels in Paris. While in Paris, he published some of his first compositions, which were well received. In 1788, he made a visit to London, where he played the viola in Saloman's quartet. Fiorillo made his last public appearance in London in 1794, when he performed a concerto for the viola at the Antient Concert. After leaving London, he went to Amsterdam, and from there to Paris in 1823.

Music historian Philip J. Bone felt that the "thirty-six caprices for the violin, rank equally with the classical studies of [Rodolphe ] Kreutzer and [Pierre] Rode, and, apart from their usefulness, are not without merit as compositions...they have been edited by innumerable violinists of repute, and [Louis] Spohr wrote and published an accompanying violin part to them."

Fiorillo's other compositions include concertos, duos, trios, quartets, and quintets, for stringed instruments.

== Compositions ==
- Quintette avec cor, flûte, violon, alto, violoncelle
- Six quatuors, op. 1; dedicated to Monseigneur le Prince de Prusse
- Six trios pour 2 violons et basse, op. 2
- 36 Études ou caprices pour violon, op. 3
- Six quatuors concertants avec flûte, op. 4
- Six duos pour 2 violons, op. 5
- Six quatuors concertants, op. 6
- Six quatuors, op. 7
- Six trios concertants pour flûte, violon et alto, op. 8
- Trois sonates de clavecin ou le piano-forte, avec accompagnement du violon (Mlles Erard, Paris)
- Trois sonates de clavecin ou le piano-forte, avec accompagnement du violon, op. 7; dedication: Sa Majesté le Reine de Prusse
- Trois sonates de clavecin ou le piano-forte, avec accompagnement du violon, op. 9
- Trois quintetti concertants pour 2 violons, 2 altos et violoncelle, op. 12
- Six duos concertants pour 2 violons, op. 14
- Tre duetti concertanti con due violini, op. 15 (1795, Artaria, Vienne)
- Trois quatuors, op. 16
- Trois duos concertants pour violon et violoncelle, op. 31

=== Revisions ===
- Ferdinand David (Hrsg), Violinetüden, 1854
- Walther Davisson, Etuden, 1988

== Discography ==
In 2023 the Italian violist Marco Misciagna recorded the world premiere of Fiorillo's 36 Caprices op.3 for violin, transcribed for viola by himself.
