= Micah Hawkins =

American composer

Micah Hawkins (January 1, 1777 – July 29, 1825) was an American poet, playwright, and composer, largely of music for theater, who also operated a New York City tavern and grocery store.

He was born in Head of the Harbor, New York and moved to New York City in 1798, where he worked in several jobs, including carriage-maker, before opening a grocery and inn. He played flute, piano, and violin.

His blackface song "Backside Albany", ridiculing the British during the War of 1812 was to be sung "in the character of a Negro sailor", ridiculing the British efforts. It was first performed in Albany, New York, February 15, 1815, as part of a play, The Battle of Plattsburgh.

His operetta The Saw-Mill, or A Yankee Trick, the first opera by an American composer on an American theme, had six performances at New York's Chatham Garden Theatre in 1824–25.

Hawkins was the uncle of painter William Sidney Mount, who lived with him for a time in childhood.
