= Giovanni Morandi (composer) =

Italian composer

Giovanni Morandi (12 May 1777 – 23 November 1856) was an Italian organist and composer of the late Classical era and the early Romantic era.

== Life ==
Morandi was born in Pergola (1777), and died in Senigallia (1856), Italy. He was the most-important Italian composer of organ music in the first half of the 19th century, and was an early mentor of Gioachino Rossini.

== Works ==
=== Organ music ===
- Sonate per gli organi moderni (I raccolta)
- Sonate per gli organi moderni (II raccolta)
- Sonate per gli organi moderni (III raccolta)
- Sonate per gli organi moderni (IV raccolta)
- Sonate per gli organi moderni (V raccolta)
- Sonate per gli organi moderni (VI raccolta)
- Sonate per gli organi moderni (VII raccolta)
- Sonate per gli organi moderni (VIII raccolta)
- Sonate per gli organi moderni (IX raccolta)
- Sonate per gli organi moderni (X raccolta)
- Sonate per gli organi moderni (XI raccolta)
- Sonate per gli organi moderni (XII raccolta)
- Gran Sinfonia con variazioni
- Pastorale coll'imitazione del suono de' zampognari
- Il santo Natale
- 6 Sonate
- Pastorale
- Nuova Pastorale
- Sinfonia in pastorale pel SS. Natale
- Raccolta di Sinfonie
- Suonate per l'accompagnamento d'una Messa solenne
- Marcia militare da eseguirsi nelle processioni
- Rondo' con imitazione de' campanelli in Fa
- Sinfonia per organo
- Pastorale
- Gran Raccolta di Sonate per organo di una difficoltà progressiva
- 2 marce
- Due Marcie in onore di Pio IX
- 1ª Raccolta di Sonate libro I
- 1ª Raccolta di Sonate libro II
- Raccolta di quattro Sonate
- Raccolta 2ª di dodici Sonate di facile esecuzione. Fasc. 1
- Raccolta 2ª di dodici Sonate di facile esecuzione. Fasc. 2
- Due marce
- Raccolta di Divertimenti e Marcie per Banda militare, eseguiti nelle feste popolari in varie città dello Stato Pontificio, ridotte dall’autore per Organo (o Pianoforte) di facilissima esecuzione

== Sources ==
- Giuseppe Radole, Manuale di letteratura organistica. Dal Trecento al Duemila, Pizzicato, 2005. ISBN 978-88-7736-489-0
- Giovanni Morandi, Opere per organo a 4 mani. Edizione critica e Catalogo delle opere a stampa per Organo, a cura di Gabriele Moroni, Bologna, UtOrpheus, 2005 ("Collezione Musicale Marchigiana", 3).
- Giovanni Morandi, Sonate per organo. Prima raccolta (1808), edizione critica a cura di Gabriele Moroni, Ebook, Società Editrice Dante Alighieri, 2012. ISBN 978-88-534-4009-9
