= Mateli Magdalena Kuivalatar =

Mateli Magdalena Kuivalatar (8 May 1771 – 29 December 1846) was a Finnish folksinger, seer, and cunning woman. She is regarded as the most noted among the known Finnish folksingers of her sex. She was a strong influence on Kanteletar by Elias Lönnrot.

== Life ==
Mateli Magdalena Kuivalatar was born 8 May 1771, and her family belonged to the peasantry class. She was the sixth of eleven children of Antti Antinpoika Kuivalainen (b. 1741) and Valpuri Matintytär Muroke from Oskola, Tohmajärvi. She married Pietari (Pekka) Antinpoika Ikonen in 1793 and had eleven children. She was widowed in 1832.

Elias Lönnrot encountered Kuivalatar in September 1838. He was by then almost done with the Kanteletar, but after meeting her and realizing her knowledge of the subject, he revised his work and started all over again. Her folk songs were rare, and often centered around a young woman's longing for love. Her poems were also included events of the Kalevala.

She died of cancer.
