= Simon Le Duc =

French violinist (1742–1777)

Simon Le Duc, more commonly Leduc (Paris, 15 January 1742 – 22 January 1777), was a French violinist, soloist at the Concert Spirituel, music publisher and composer. His younger brother, Pierre Le Duc (1755–1818), was also a violinist. Leduc was a pupil of the famous violinist and professor at the Paris Conservatoire, Pierre Gaviniès. He later became director of the Concerts Spirituel, with Gaviniès and François-Joseph Gossec

During the child prodigy Wolfgang Amadeus Mozart's first tour of Europe in 1763–64, Wolfgang and his father Leopold Mozart had a chance to hear Leduc play. Leopold, an authority on violin performance who had published a treatise on violin playing in 1756 which is still read today, praised Leduc in his travel diary: "He plays well." Leduc also composed many pieces for violin, including at least two sets of violin sonatas (published as opuses 1 and 4), three violin concertos, and some chamber music.

In his survey of music of the galant period, Robert Gjerdingen notes strong similarities between Leduc's style and that of his Neapolitan contemporaries, especially Cimarosa. Gjerdingen writes, "Leduc wrote highly refined music for small aristocratic gatherings in chambers and salons. The fluency and perfection of his style was matched by few others", and he argues that Leduc's music was in the "mainstream" of eighteenth-century galant style, though it is mostly forgotten today.

== Works, editions and recordings ==
- The complete symphonic works. La Stagione dir. Michael Schneider, CPO
