= Pierre Gaviniès =

French violinist, pedagogue and composer

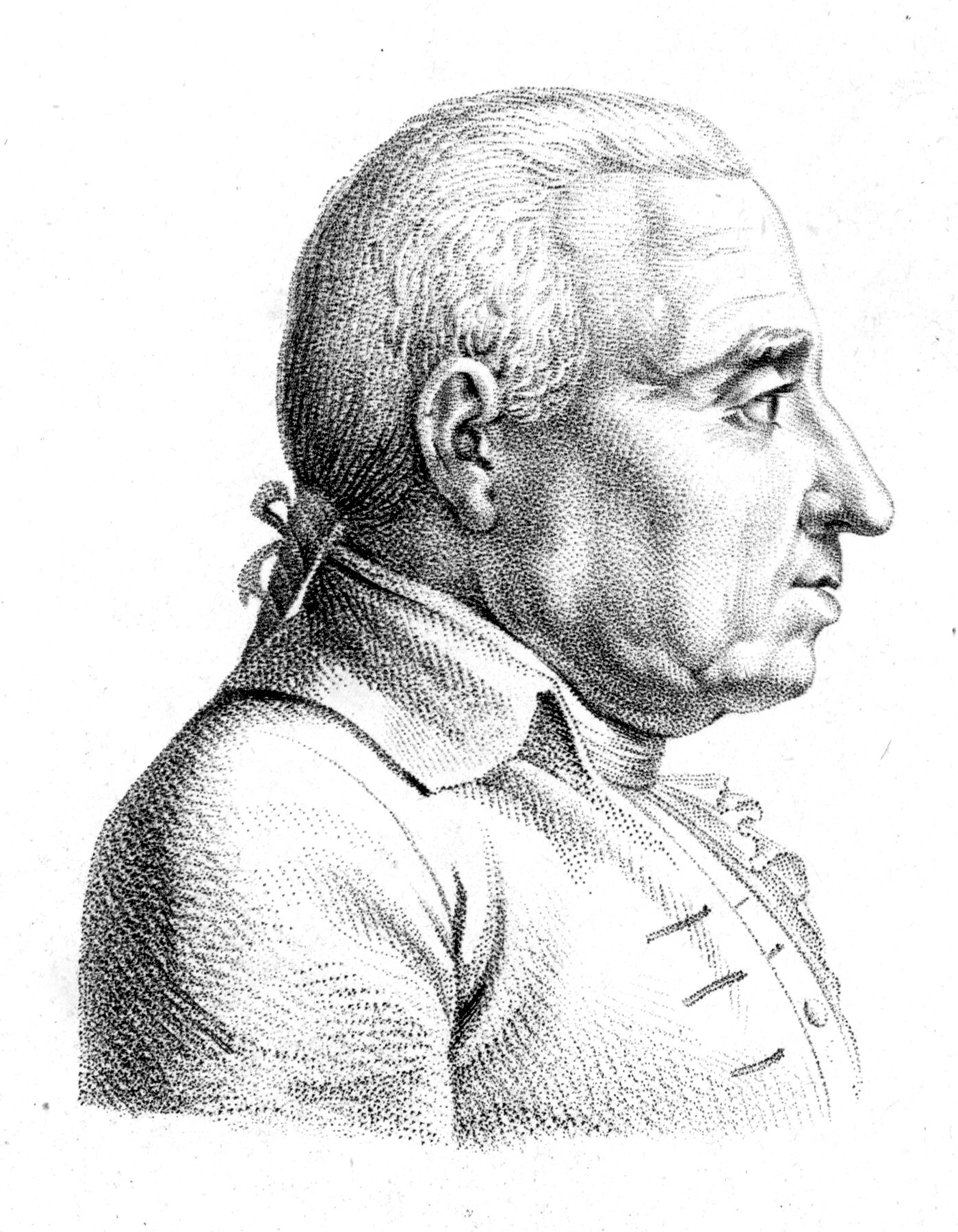
Pierre Gaviniès

Pierre Gaviniès (11 May 1728 – 8 September 1800) was a French violinist, pedagogue and composer.

== Life ==
Born in Bordeaux as the son of a luthier, Gaviniès was taken to Paris by his father in 1734. At age 13, he made his debut at the Concert Spirituel in Les Tuileries playing a Jean-Marie Leclair sonata for two violins. Sometime around 1753 he received a prison sentence as the result of an affair with a Countess.

In 1762, he reached the peak of his career. Giovanni Battista Viotti described him as the French Tartini, a singular compliment. Jean Godefroy Eckhard, Leduc L’Ainé, Rodolphe Kreutzer, and Romain de Brasseure dedicated works to him. The cellist Martin Berteau named a sonata "La Gavinies".

His seminal work is the 24 Matinées published in 1794, a compilation of violin studies that includes extremely complex passages with the main goal of developing bowing facility.

Gaviniès taught violin at the Paris Conservatoire from 1795 until his death. One of his pupils was Antoine-Laurent Baudron.

== Works ==
- Opus 1 - 6 sonatas for violin (1760)
- Le Prétendu intermède, Italian comedy in 3 acts (première in Paris on 6 November 1760)
- Recueil d'airs à 3 parties for two violins, alto and basse continue (1763)
- Opus 3 - 6 sonatas for violin (1764)
- Opus 4 - 6 sonatas for violin (1764)
- 2 suites for Christmas (1764)
- 3 sonates for violin solo (including Le Tombeau de Gaviniès) (1770)
- Opus 5 - 6 sonates for violin (1774)
- Les Vingt-quatre matinées (1794)
