= Concert Spirituel =

1725–90 series of public concerts in Paris

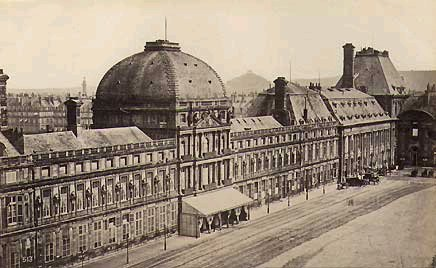
The Tuileries Palace in 1865. The Concert Spirituel took place on the second floor of the central pavilion.

The Concert Spirituel (English: Spiritual Concert) was one of the first public concert series in existence. The concerts began in Paris in 1725 and ended in 1790. Later, concerts or series of concerts with the same name occurred in multiple places including Paris, Vienna, London and more. The series was founded to provide entertainment during the Easter fortnight and on religious holidays when the other spectacles (the Paris Opera, Comédie-Française, and Comédie-Italienne) were closed. The programs featured a mixture of sacred choral works and virtuosic instrumental pieces, and for many years took place in a magnificently-decorated Salle des Cent Suisses (Hall of the Hundred Swiss Guards) in the Tuileries Palace. They started at six o’clock in the evening and were primarily attended by well-to-do bourgeois, the lower aristocracy, and foreign visitors. In 1784 the concerts were moved to the stage area of the Salle des Machines (an enormous former opera house in the Tuileries), and in 1790, when the royal family was confined in the Tuileries, they took place in a Paris theater.

== Original series (1725–1790) ==
The first concert took place on March 18, 1725. Two of Delalande's motets and Corelli's Christmas Concerto were performed.

The series was managed by a succession of director-entrepreneurs, who paid a license fee in order to obtain a royal privilege which granted them an exception to the monopoly on public performance of music held by the Paris Opera (Académie Royale de Musique). The first director was Anne Danican Philidor, brother of the composer and chess master François-André Danican Philidor. Philidor went bankrupt within two years. His successors, Pierre Simart and Jean-Joseph Mouret (1728–1733), expanded the operation with a series of "French Concerts," but met the same unhappy fate. These early concerts helped to establish the career of violinist Jean-Marie Leclair.

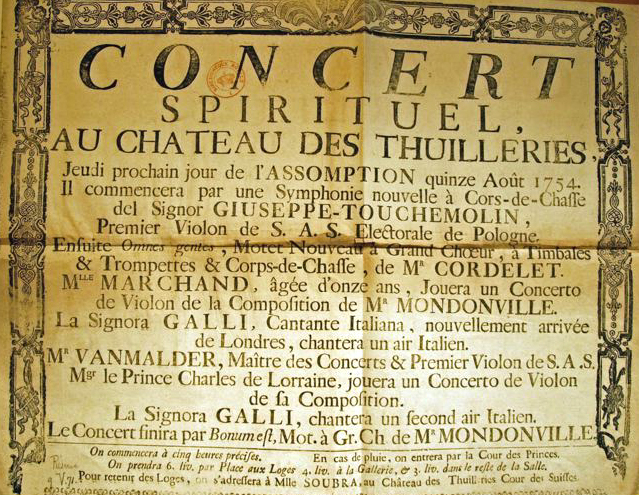
Poster advertising the Concert Spirituel to be held on 15 August 1754

Because no one was willing to take their place, the series was administered by the Académie Royale de Musique for the next fourteen years (1734–1748). During this period, the works of French composers (particularly Michel-Richard Delalande, Mouret, and Jean-Joseph de Mondonville) were favored, although Italian works were never entirely absent. The series was finally profitable because the Académie did not have to pay the license fee, but in general this was a period of stagnation. Two new entrepreneurs, Joseph-Nicolas-Pancrace Royer, and Gabriel Capperan (1748–1762), purchased the privilege, redecorated the concert hall, augmented the size of the orchestra and chorus, and set out to make their fortunes. They continued to perform new and existing French works, but also presented the most famous Italian singers. Beginning in 1755, oratorios with French texts were introduced and became popular.

The series was soon profitable. In 1762 a well-connected royal functionary, Antoine Dauvergne, forced Royer's widow out of the operation she had run since her husband's death in 1755. Dauvergne and various associates managed the concerts until 1773. The interest of the public was excited by adding a motet competition and by expanding the presentation of instrumental virtuosi beyond violinists to include masters of wind instruments. Although the concerts remained profitable, Dauvergne abandoned the concerts. As a result, the Académie replaced him with Pierre Gaviniès, Simon Le Duc and François Joseph Gossec (1773–1777).

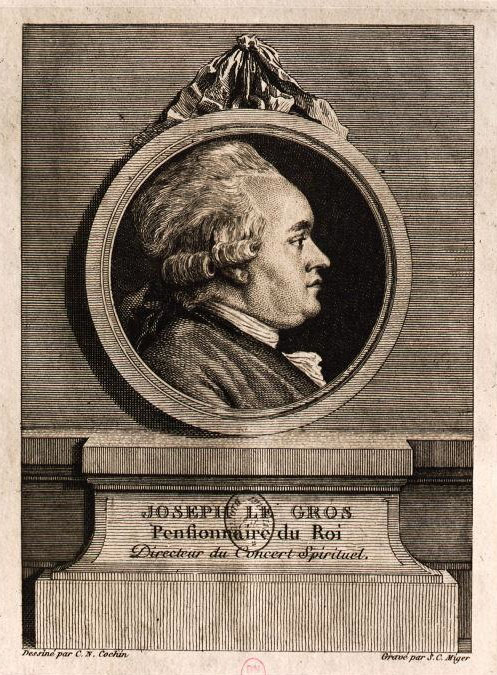
Joseph Le Gros «Directeur du Concert Spirituel» Drawing by Charles-Nicolas Cochin

From 1777 the Concert Spirituel was directed by Joseph Legros, its last director. Legros, a star singer at the Paris Opéra, managed the concerts until they came to an end in 1790 with the French Revolution. He attracted the most famous performers in Europe and renewed the repertoire, eliminating 17th-century grand motets and replacing them with works by Johann Christian Bach, Wolfgang Amadeus Mozart (the Paris Symphony in 1778), Joseph Haydn, whose symphonies were on nearly every program, and others. Legros even commissioned new works for the series, such as Mozart's Symphony No. 31 in D Major, K. 297.

The final concert took place on 13 May 1790.

== The 19th century ==
During the Napoleonic era concerts were occasionally held in Paris under the title "Concerts Spirituel", particularly after 1805 as religious feeling revived in France. During the Restoration (1814–1830), the Théâtre-Italien and Académie Royale de Musique gave 6 to 9 Concerts Spirituels per year, but only during Holy Week. They became a regular feature at the Société des Concerts du Conservatoire shortly after it was founded in 1828, and remained so for most of the nineteenth century. They were frequently performed as benefit performances featuring notable soloists; for example, Charles-Valentin Alkan led one of the three Concerts Spirituels in 1828.

== The 20th century ==
In 1988 Hervé Niquet, a specialist in Baroque music, founded an early-music ensemble called Le Concert Spirituel in order to perform the repertoire of French music composed in the eighteenth century on period instruments.

== Sources ==
- Entry on Le Concert Spirituel on the Naxos.com website

== Bibliography ==
- Heartz, D. (1993). The Concert Spirituel in the Tuileries Palace. Early Music, 21(2), 241–248. JSTOR 3128222
- Michel Brenet, Les Concerts en France sous l'Ancien Régime, Paris, Fischbacher, 1900, réimprimé à New York, Da Capo Press, 1970.
- Joann Élart, Musiciens et répertoires de concert en France à la fin de l'Ancien Régime, thèse de doctorat dir. Patrick Taïeb, université de Rouen, 2005.
- Les derniers feux des concerts spirituels parisiens (1816-1831); summary of thesis by Olivier Morand
- Constant Pierre, Histoire du Concert Spirituel (1725–1790), 2nd ed., Paris, Heugel / Société française de Musicologie, 2000. ISBN 2-85357-007-X.
- Beverly Wilcox, The Music Libraries of the Concert Spirituel: Canons, Repertoires, and Bricolage in Eighteenth-Century Paris, Ph.D. dissertation, University of California, Davis, 2013.
