= List of Le Chevalier D'Eon episodes =

Le Chevalier D'Eon is a 24-episode anime television series produced by Production I.G. The series was originally broadcast on the WOWOW network in Japan every Saturday from August 19, 2006, to February 24, 2007. Loosely based on the historical figure Chevalier D'Eon, the story follows the exploits of D'Eon de Beaumont as he attempts to solve the mystery behind his sister's murder while serving as a knight of France. The series was initially licensed by ADV Films, but was one of over thirty titles that were transferred to Funimation Entertainment.

The series features one opening theme and one ending theme throughout all 24-episodes. The opening theme is "Born" by Miwako Okuda, and the ending theme is "Over night" by Aya. The latter was written specially for the series.

As of October 2007, Media Factory released the series in twelve DVD volumes that contained two episodes each. ADV Films released the series in six DVD volumes with four episodes each as of December 2007. In December 2008, Funimation released a complete box set of the series DVDs, which contains all the episodes in four discs. The first two discs contain commentaries along with some of the series' episodes, an additional disc with extra content such as promotional videos and interviews with the original Japanese cast is also included.

== Episode list ==
No.	Title	Directed by	Written by	Original release date
I	"D'Eon∴Lia"; Transliteration: "Deon∴Ria" (Japanese: デオン∴リア)	Kazuhiro Furuhashi	Tow Ubukata	August 19, 2006
D'Eon de Beaumont discovers that his older sister, Lia de Beaumont, has been murdered. Determined to solve the mystery behind her death, he joins the French secret police in their investigations of the disappearances of a number of young women. After D'Eon reveals a secret document to his friend, Bernis, the members of the secret police are murdered and Bernis is abducted. D'Eon is asked to surrender the document in exchange for Bernis's life, but when he makes his way to the rendezvous point, he discovers that Bernis has been transformed into a zombie-like creature.
II	"The Four Musketeers"; Transliteration: "Yon jūshi" (Japanese: 四銃士)	Hideyo Yamamoto	Yasuyuki Moto	August 26, 2006
Confronted by the transformed Bernis, D'Eon is suddenly possessed by Lia's soul. Lia kills Bernis, but D'Eon does not recall anything that had happened during his possessed state afterward. D'Eon is sent to the palace to recover from his injuries, but leaves right after he awakens. Queen Marie orders her page, Robin, to follow and serve D'Eon. D'Eon and Robin are pursued by false French police, and are aided by a man named Durand. The trio eventually encounters D'Eon's mentor, Teillagory, who joins them and dubs their group "The Four Musketeers". They are then confronted by female zombie-like creatures, which are now referred to as "Gargoyles".
III	"Sword of Indignation"; Transliteration: "Hifun no ken" (Japanese: 悲憤の剣)	Koichi Hatsumi	Takeshi Matsuzawa	September 2, 2006
The Four Musketeers defeat the Gargoyles, and manage to apprehend the man controlling them, but Durand releases him and they both escape. Robin follows Durand, while D'Eon and Teillagory follow the man back to his masters. They find out that Caron, the man they were pursuing, works for Comte de Saint-Germain, who sets the house on fire to aid their escape after realizing that D'Eon and Teillagory are eavesdropping. D'Eon forces his way into the house and discovers a book that he believes to be important. D'Eon and his companions meet Durand at Lia's casket at his request. King Louis XV and Duc d'Broglie then invite D'Eon to follow in his sister's footsteps and join Le Secret du Roi.
IV	"Follower of the Revolution"; Transliteration: "Kakumei no shinto" (Japanese: 革命の信徒)	Satoshi Saga	Shotaro Suga	September 9, 2006
Duc d'Orléans starts to make his move against the Four Musketeers with the help of Saint-Germain and Caron under the banner of the Revolutionary Brethren. Meanwhile, Louis and Broglie reveal the existence of a progressive faction supporting the French Revolution behind the scenes to D'Eon and his companions. They also reveal that Lia had been found dead shortly after she had been dispatched to Russia as an agent of Le Secret du Roi. D'Eon and his companions accept the invitation to join Le Secret du Roi, and they pursue Vorontsov, a Russian spy working for Orléans. They are unable to capture Vorontsov, and Caron kills himself after confronting D'Eon and Lia.
V	"Palais-Royal"; Transliteration: "Pare rowaiyaru" (Japanese: パレ·ロワイヤル)	Hideki Ito	Yasuyuki Muto	September 16, 2006
D'Eon spends a day in Longchamp with his fiancée and childhood friend, Anna Rochefort. On the way back, he sees Vorontsov and chases after him, leaving Anna behind. However, he lets Vorontsov get away and reports of this to his companions. Meanwhile, the King visits Orléans and leaves him with a warning not to wage war against his country. The Four Musketeers try to catch up to Vorontsov, who is planning to board a ship at a dock in Le Havre. They fail to get to him in time, as that ship has set sail towards Russia.
VI	"Knights of the King"; Transliteration: "Ō no kishi" (Japanese: 王の騎士)	Hiroyuki Kanbe	Takeshi Matsuzawa	September 23, 2006
The Four Musketeers receive notice of a new mission from Broglie, having them wait until midnight to make their decision. D'Eon later visits Queen Marie to ask why his sister's soul is so angry and still wandering on earth. The Queen tells him to put on Lia's old dress so that Lia can possess his body once more and tell the truth. D'Eon realizes that Lia has sworn vengeance in order to kill the traitor who stole the Royal Psalms from her.
VII	"Gargoyles"; Transliteration: "Gāgoiru" (Japanese: ガーゴイル)	Itsuro Kawasaki	Hiroaki Jinno	September 30, 2006
The Four Musketeers receive new orders from the King to head out to Russia in order to retrieve the Royal Psalms that were stolen by Vorontsov. They reach Cologne, posing as gemstone merchants, and stay at an inn. They immediately leave the inn after becoming suspicious of the innkeeper, narrowly avoiding a confrontation with Count Cagliostro and Lorenza, who use Gargoyles in the form of dogs to track them down. Cagliostro and Lorenza attempt to attack them again, but their attempts are thwarted by Lia.
VIII	"An Audience with the Empress"; Transliteration: "Jotei ekken" (Japanese: 女帝謁見)	Hideyo Yamamoto	Hiroaki Jinno	October 7, 2006
After a long journey pursuing Vorontsov, D'Eon and the others arrive at Saint Petersburg. To obtain permission from Empress Tsaritsa Elizaveta to operate in Russia, D'Eon and Robin infiltrate a masquerade ball dressed up in women's clothing. Maximilien Robespierre, Cagliostro, and Lorenza approach Vorontsov and ally themselves with Grand Chancellor Bestuzhev, who intends to assassinate the Empress. Meanwhile, Durand and Teillagory are forcefully taken to see a veiled woman who is aware of this plotted assassination.
IX	"The Lovers"; Transliteration: "Aijin tachi" (Japanese: 愛人たち)	Takashi Kobayashi	Shotaro Suga	October 14, 2006
After proving his true identity, D'Eon gains the trust of Elizaveta. It is revealed that the Empress and Lia had been former friends and dedicated themselves to reform Russia. The Empress grants D'Eon and his companions permission to arrest Vorontsov, who turns out to be a nobleman who was once under her command. Bestuzhev and Vorontsov carry out their plan to assassinate the Empress, but are thwarted and deceived by D'Eon and his comrades. Elizaveta arrests Bestuzhev as a consequence and thanks the Four Musketeers for their service.
X	"The Royal Psalms"; Transliteration: "Ōke no shi" (Japanese: 王家の詩)	Hideki Ito	Yasuyuki Muto	October 21, 2006
The Empress allows D'Eon and the others to do any means necessary to capture Vorontsov. Pyotr III, fearing that he would be accused of being involved in the attempted assassination of the Empress, plans to put the blame on his wife, Ekaterina. Vorontsov, who was given a Psalm by Lorenza, later challenges D'Eon by letter to a duel, but their battle is abruptly cut short when the building they are in collapses. Maximilien manages to sneak into Elizaveta's meeting with her new parliament, turning the members of the parliament into Gargoyles and successfully killing her.
XI	"The Rain on Saint Petersburg"; Transliteration: "Seito no ame" (Japanese: 聖都の雨)	Koichi Hatsumi	Takeshi Matsuzawa	October 28, 2006
With the Empress now dead, Pyotr becomes Emperor of Russia. Ekaterina approaches the Four Musketeers and reveals herself to be the woman who warned them about the assassination plot. With their help, she manages to reveal Pyotr's murderous nature and ascend the throne. As the guards move in to arrest Pyotr, Vorontsov, and Bestuzhev, they attempt to escape. Pyotr is recaptured by Teillagory, Betsuzhev is killed by Maximilien in front of Durand, and Vorontsov enters into another confrontation with D'Eon.
XII	"Rest in Peace in Your Motherland"; Transliteration: "Sokoku ni nemure" (Japanese: 祖国に眠れ)	Hiroyuki Kanbe	Yasuyuki Muto	November 4, 2006
D'Eon does battle with Vorontsov, but it is Lia who ultimately kills him. Durand and Maximilien come face to face, and Maximilien reveals he was not only the one who stole the Royal Psalms, but also the one who killed Lia in the past. Ekaterina gives Pyotr the death penalty as punishment for his wrongful acts. Meanwhile, back in France, it is revealed that Marquise de Pompadour and Praslin were the ones pulling the strings in Russia, and that all her plans for that country have been ruined because of D'Eon's group. It is hinted that her plans are to plant the seeds of rebellion in France, and the Four Musketeers depart for London to follow Maximilien.
XIII	"The Sign"; Transliteration: "Kizashi" (Japanese: 兆し)	Daizen Komatsuda	Takeshi Matsuzawa	November 18, 2006
Upon arriving in London, the Four Musketeers meet with Comte de Guercy, the French ambassador to England, for his help. Guercy and the Four Musketeers attend a party at night thrown by Queen Mary Charlotte and King George III with the intention of obtaining some secret documents possessed by Robert Wood, the British Undersecretary of Foreign Affairs. Mary recognizes Lia, and Guercy invites the former to a party at the French Embassy. George coaxes Wood into going as well. Meanwhile, Maximilien takes Cagliostro and Lorenza to visit Dashwood and Whitehead at Medmenham for their assistance.
XIV	"Robert Wood's Document Case"; Transliteration: "Robāto Uddo no kaban" (Japanese: ロバート·ウッドの鞄)	Shinsuke Terusawa	Shotaro Suga	November 25, 2006
D'Eon tells the others that he received a vision of Maximilien, who seemed to need Lia's soul in order to reincarnate the Royal Psalms. Guercy and the Four Musketeers execute their plan to make copies of Wood's documents by hosting a dinner party at the French Embassy. Robin steals Wood's briefcase and replaces it with a false one while the latter is distracted by a mock duel being performed by Teillagory and one of Guercy's servants. Durand and Robin look through the papers, but Robin's hand is cursed by a spell cast on one of the papers in Wood's briefcase. Durand attempts to destroy the paper to no avail, and is about to resort to cutting Robin's hand off, but Lia breaks the spell from the other room.
XV	"The Final Secret Order"; Transliteration: "Saigo no mitsumei" (Japanese: 最後の密命)	Hideki Ito	Yasuyuki Muto	December 9, 2006
D'Eon is now haunted by visions of Maximilien, and he is no longer sure whether it is Lia's memories or Maximilien's doing. Wood, meeting with Earl of Sandwich, discovers that the documents had been tampered with, and Maximilien assists them in their intention to capture the Four Musketeers. Meanwhile, Durand receives orders from King Louis to kill any of his comrades who read the contents of the Royal Psalms once they obtained it, and to eliminate D'Eon regardless of what he knows about the Royal Psalms. Deeply disturbed by this order, Durand leaves his companions in their safe house, saying that he just needed some air. Their quarters are raided by several British soldiers shortly after. D'Eon and the others manage to escape the guards, but Durand is caught outside. Whitehead attempts to kill Durand, but Maximilien murders the former instead, choosing to capture Durand alive. Back in the abbey, Dashwood finds out about Whitehead's death.
XVI	"The Whereabouts of the Soul"; Transliteration: "Tamashii no yukue" (Japanese: 魂の行方)	Hideyo Yamamoto	Yasuyuki Muto	December 16, 2006
Durand is imprisoned and interrogated by Maximilien, who questions Durand's loyalty after receiving Louis's order. Meanwhile, Louis and Pompadour find out about possible hostility from England. Guercy is told to betray France, and when he seems unmoved by their offers, King George himself comes to convince Guercy. D'Eon and the others resolve to free Durand, and D'Eon approaches Queen Mary to ask for aid, which she grants. D'Eon then finds out that the real Mary had died the previous year, and that her younger sister had used her own body as a vessel for Mary's soul at Medmenham shortly after. George, Lia, Maximilien, Dashwood, and even Saint-Germain were witnesses at this ceremony at that time. Mary asks D'Eon to allow her to speak with Lia, but D'Eon abruptly takes his leave.
XVII	"Medmenham Abbey"; Transliteration: "Medomenamu no chi" (Japanese: メドメナムの地)	Itsuro Kawasaki	Yasuyuki Muto	December 23, 2006
At the abbey, Dashwood tells Maximilien to atone for his sins by drawing the blood of the Four Musketeers. D'Eon informs his companions that Saint-Germain is in charge of the Poets, but he fails to mention about Mary. Durand is freed, and, after reuniting with his comrades, they head off to Medmenham. Maximilien has been summoned by Dashwood, and he gets to the abbey with Cagliostro and Lorenza before D'Eon and his comrades do. Maximilien confronts Dashwood, and is killed despite Lorenza's attempts to help him. The Four Musketeers arrive at the abbey and are attacked by Sandwich and some of the Medmenham monks. Lia senses Maximilien's death and sheds tears of blood before swiftly reciting Psalms.
XVIII	"The New World"; Transliteration: "Shin sekai" (Japanese: 新世界)	Naoyoshi Shiotani	Shotaro Suga	January 6, 2007
Lia continues to recite Psalms, killing off the Medmenham monks that attacked them and slowly cursing her own comrades, but she is calmed by Teillagory. Meanwhile, Dashwood takes Maximilien's blood and puts it in the Royal Psalms, then orders Cagliostro and Lorenza to relay a message to Saint-Germain. Maximilien's body is placed in a casket, but is stolen by Cagliostro and Lorenza. The Four Musketeers break into the abbey, and Lia confronts Dashwood. Dashwood states that Lia was once in love with Maximilien before he is defeated by her with Maximilien's aid through reciting Psalms. In France, Pompadour and Praslin find out about Louis's decision with regard to the British intentions to declare war against France. Maximilien is eventually revived in the end.
XIX	"Toward a Blood Red"; Transliteration: "Kurenai ni somuru made" (Japanese: 紅に染むるまで)	Kazuhiro Furuhashi, Hiroshi Kaburagi	Yasuyuki Muto	January 13, 2007
The Four Musketeers obtain the Royal Psalms, along with documents that would clear them of the charges of stealing state documents against them. Durand, in an effort to avoid having to kill his comrades, attempts to return to France by himself with the Royal Psalms and the documents. He heads to the French Embassy and attempts to blackmail Guercy into getting him a ship and ensuring his comrades' safety. Maximilien arrives and attempts to convince Durand to turn his back on his duties as a knight of France, but Durand refuses to do so. Upon reuniting with his comrades, Durand is turned into a Gargoyle by Maximilien, who prevents Lia from lifting the curse. Given no other option, D'Eon stabs Durand in the chest. In France, Louis surrenders the American territories to Britain in exchange for peace, which does not please Pompadour.
XX	"Ready to Die for..." Transliteration: "Junzuru mono to..." (Japanese: 殉ずるものと...)	Hideki Ito	Yasuyuki Muto	January 27, 2007
After Durand's death, his back-up plan is set into motion. In a written confession he composed right before being set free, he stated that he worked alone, and instructed the authorities to search the French Embassy. Guercy is arrested for being an accomplice in the theft of state documents, Sandwich resigns his position, and George abdicates his throne. Durand's body is left in England as D'Eon, Robin, and Teillagory depart for France. Maximilien then visits the grave with Cagliostro and Lorenza. Using Durand's sword he has Lorenza carve Durand's mark on his skin. When D'Eon and the others return to France, Robin distances himself from his companions. While Robin is out, Orléans arrives and captures D'Eon, revealing that Teillagory had been working for him the whole time.
XXI	"The Price of Honor"; Transliteration: "Meiyo no daishō" (Japanese: 名誉の代償)	Asano Katsuya	Shotaro Suga	February 3, 2007
Robin manages to elude capture and sneaks into the Orléans's mansion to rescue D'Eon, but is forced to retreat after being seen by Maximilien, who claims that he is not responsible for Lia's death and attempts to convince D'Eon to read the Royal Psalms. Failing at that, he bestows greater control of the Royal Psalms upon Lorenza, who attempts to kill D'Eon's body with her newly acquired powers, but is ultimately defeated by Lia's spirit. The people march against Orléans, who suspects that the rebellion was instigated by King Louis. Meanwhile, Queen Marie finally returns Belle, a mysterious talking skull in her care, to Pompadour, revealed to be her mother. D'Eon escapes his confinement and duels with Teillagory which ends in a stalemate with D'Eon pinned to the wall. Orléans prepares to kill D'Eon, but Robin interferes and shoots Orléans in retaliation. However, Teillagory shields Orléans from the bullet, leaving Robin in shock.
XXII	"NQM"; Transliteration: "NQM"	Koichi Hatsumi	Yasuyuki Muto	February 10, 2007
Orléans tries to flee after Teillagory dies, but he is caught by Broglie. Meanwhile, Maximilien kills Pompadour just as she is about to destroy her dead daughter's skull. Saint-Germain tries to get Marie to help join them in their cause, but she refuses and defeats him in a fight before Maximilien shows up. She reveals that the Gardens of Versailles is the birthplace of the Royal Psalms. Maximilen aids Marie in killing Saint-Germain upon his betrayal. Robin heads off to Versailles to deliver the Royal Psalms to Marie. The severely injured Saint-Germain calls on Cagliostro and Lorenza for aid, but Lorenza kills him instead. Louis has Broglie pour a glass of poisoned wine for Marie to drink. Marie, who is already aware of this, requests Robin to protect and care for Dauphin Auguste, the King's grandson, in the future. Marie dies in Louis's arms after drinking the wine just as Anna walks into the room, so he draws a sword and prepares to kill her for witnessing the Queen's death.
XXIII	"Beloved, and Therefore..."; Transliteration: "Saiai naru - yue ni..." (Japanese: 最愛なる-ゆえに...)	Itsuro Kawasaki	Tow Ubukata	February 17, 2007
Louis escapes the room after Broglie blocks the shot executed by Robin, who is enraged upon witnessing the deaths of the two ladies. In the past, Maximilien proposing to Lia during their trip to Versailles, though disliking the fact that the King was keeping them apart for so long. Maximilien abandoned the King's orders for him to go to Russia, stealing the Royal Psalms and giving them to Lia for her to read instead. While she manages to read the book, she wrote Maximilien a letter claiming that she was unable to do so and rejecting his love. Meanwhile, in the present, Maximilien approaches a now hateful Robin, commenting that the ability for Robin to actually carry the Royal Psalms is a sign that the book wants change to occur in France, and telling him to take revenge for his murdered friends. D'Eon is chased down by palace guards, but Lorenza kills them, and, once free he visits Anna's coffin. He then sneaks in to see Broglie and forces him to bring him to the royal chambers. Lia then takes over, asking Louis whether he was responsible for her past death.
XXIV	"In the Beginning Was the Word"; Transliteration: "Kotoba ariki" (Japanese: 言葉ありき)	Kazuhiro Furuhashi, Hiroshi Kaburagi	Tow Ubukata	February 24, 2007
Louis and Broglie confess that they have been behind the murder of Lia all along. They explain it was prophesied through the Royal Psalms that Maximilen, unveiled as the King's true son, would destroy the royal family. Maximilien had been switched at birth, not to have ties to the royal family. The reason why King kept Maximilen and Lia apart was because they share the same father through separate marriages. Lia, swearing loyalty to the throne must protect Louis from Lorenza and Maximilien, with Robin and Cagliostro in tow. Saint-Germain, now a Gargoyle, then crashes through the window and attempts to grab the Royal Psalms from Louis but is ultimately killed by Lia. Brogie tries to impale Maximilien with his sword, but the latter blinds the former as he falls to the ground. Lia leaves and later meets Maximilen in the gardens, where he finally succumbs to his wound and dies after giving his name and quest for revolution to Robin, destroying the site in the process. D'Eon returns to Lia's tomb and reads the last verse of the Royal Psalms that she had hidden within herself and then sets fire to her body as it floats down the river. The two of them, still sharing his body, then live as a woman and witness the fall of the French monarchy as well as the death of Robin by the guillotine. He lives out his remaining days with Mary, the former queen of England, recalling his past experiences and the loss of all his loved ones.

== Home media release ==
=== English ===
Funimation (Region 1/A — North America)
Volume	Episodes	Release date	Ref.
Comeplete Set	1–24	December 2, 2008	
