= List of Le Chevalier D'Eon characters =

This is a list of characters from Production I.G's Le Chevalier D'Eon anime series. The series is set in 18th century France, and its cast includes many characters that are based on real historical figures.

== Protagonists ==
The main characters of Le Chevalier D'Eon as they appear on the cover of a DVD released by Media Factory. Clockwise from top: Durand, Teillagory, Robin, and D'Eon

D'Eon de Beaumont (デオン·ド·ボーモン, Deon do Bōmon)
Voiced by: Yūki Tai (Young), Akio Nojima (Old) (Japanese); David Matranga (Young), Ted Pfister (Old) (English)
D'Eon is a member of the King's Secret, working in the shadows to keep the peace within French society. When his sister suddenly turns up floating down a river in a coffin with 'Psalms' written on it, D'Eon is thrown into a deadly struggle with revolutionaries and supernatural forces in order to uncover the truth behind his sister's death. He is loosely based on the historic figure, Chevalier d'Eon. Shortly after the beginning of the series, D'Eon is possessed by his dead sister's spirit, who manifests herself during combat and constantly mentions taking her revenge.
Ubukata had difficulty using a single character to portray D'Eon's complexity, so he opted to create two characters instead - D'Eon and his sister, Lia - and linked them together using "an occult process". Director Furuhashi mentioned D'Eon's "transformation" into Lia was different in earlier concepts; "His hair would grow longer and he'd turn into a woman. Meanwhile, his rosary would morph into a sword." Furuhashi worried that "D'Eon wouldn't be the historical figure anymore; there wouldn't be any point", so they conceptualized a less-fantastic transition between the two characters.
Lia de Beaumont (リア·ド·ボーモン, Ria do Bōmon)
Voiced by: Risa Mizuno (Japanese); Taylor Hannah (English)
Lia is D'Eon's older sister, who was killed under mysterious circumstances. Despite flashbacks of her being a caring and considerate young woman, who was well loved by the nobles and the royals, the spirit that possesses D'Eon is full of great anger, sorrow, and the desire to exact revenge.
"Lia de Beaumont" is the identity that the real-life cross-dressing Chevalier d'Eon claims to have assumed during a mission to Russia in 1756.
Robin (ロビン, Robin)
Voiced by: Megumi Matsumoto (Japanese); Tyler Galindo (English)
Robin is the Queen of France's young page who is assigned to assist D'Eon. Despite his age, he is earnest and resourceful, and his loyalty to the Queen and his companions is steadfast. Robin greatly looks up to D'Eon and his friends, and prefers to wield a flintlock pistol in combat.
Durand (ヂュラン, Juran)
Voiced by: Ken Narita (Japanese); Illich Guardiola (English)
Durand is a dashing man who is highly adept in the Florentine fencing style, wielding a rapier and main-gauche at the same time. He treasures his antique pocket watch despite the fact that it does not work properly. Durand's loyalty seems ambiguous throughout the story, but he appears to have once had affections for Lia. He eventually develops a fondness for Robin, taking the boy under his wing and even bestowing upon him his treasured pocket watch.
Teillagory (テラゴリー, Teragorī)
Voiced by: Haruo Sato (Japanese); John Swasey (English)
Teillagory was once D'Eon and Lia's fencing instructor, and is a well-respected knight from the days of Louis XIV. He carries an antique sword which was given to him by Louis XIV, and still holds onto the days of knighthood and honor. Teillagory lost his only son in a war several years prior to the start of the series. Ozaki used Anthony Hopkins in Mask of Zorro as the basis for Teillagory's character design.

== France ==
King Louis XV (ルイ十五世, Rui jyūgo sei)
Voiced by: Tetsu Inada (Japanese); Jay Hickman (English)
King of France, husband of Queen Marie. He is a charming man with a relaxed manner as he is rarely seen stressed despite the direst situations. He is loosely based on King Louis XV.
Queen Marie (マリー, Marii)
Voiced by: Yuki Kaida (Japanese); Donna Hannah (English)
Queen of France, wife of King Louis XV. She carries around a talking skull named Belle. She is usually a quiet and calm woman, holding a fascination with the Psalms and later revealed to even wield power over them. Her name is listed as "Marie Leszczynska" in the series' ending video, and she is loosely based on Maria Leszczyńska.
Belle (ベル, Beru)
Voiced by: Misato Fukuen (Japanese); Hilary Haag (English)
The mysterious talking skull with NQM carved on its forehead. Belle is kept in the company of Queen Marie, and inquires endlessly about her mother, whom the Queen has promised to reunite with Belle when the time is right. She is loosely based on Alexandrine Le Normant d'Étiolles, the deceased daughter of Madame de Pompadour.
Anna Rochefort (アンナ, Anna)
Voiced by: Eri Kitamura (Japanese); Brittney Karbowski (English)
D'Eon's childhood friend and fiancée. She looks after Dauphin Auguste (Prince Louis XVI), who sees her as a cross between elder sister and mother. Anna is described as the only person to give D'Eon tremendous love and unrestrained devotion.
Dauphin Auguste (オーギュスト, Ōgyusto)
Voiced by: Masami Suzuki (Japanese); Luci Christian (English)
The young Louis XVI, the grandson of King Louis XV. He is observant to Anna's moods, and she frequently describes him as a clever boy. He does not want to sit on the throne, but at the end of the series he is seen doing so with Broglie at his side. Loosely based on Louis XVI.
Marquise de Pompadour (ポンパドール, Ponpadōru)
Voiced by: Mayumi Yangisawa (Japanese); Shelley Calene-Black (English)
Louis XV's famous mistress, who yearns to reform France. Unlike Marie, she aims for action and radical reforms, not the quiet acceptance of the Queen. Pompadour has her own spies separate from the king's, who report the state of international affairs to her. It is revealed by Queen Marie that Belle is the late daughter of Pompadour and that Pompadour actually murdered her. Pompadour tells Belle that she strangled her to help change the country. Soon after Maximilien uses the Psalms to break Pompadour's neck. She is based on Madame de Pompadour.
Duc d'Broglie (ブロリー, Burorii)
Voiced by: Akihiko Ishizumi (Japanese); Andy McAvin (English)
King Louis XV's constant companion and head of the Le Secret du Roi, the King's secret service. He is a serious man, and one of his eyes are often closed. He worked for both King Louis XIV and XV, and is strictly loyal to them. The character is loosely based on Charles-François de Broglie, marquis de Ruffec, the second head of Le Secret du Roi.
Praslin (プラスリン, Purasurin)
Voiced by: Gen Nakano (Japanese); Scott Fix (Ep. 5-16), Carl Stethers (Ep. 17-26) (English)
French Secretary of State of Foreign Affairs, allied with Marquise de Pompadour. He has dark hair turned up at the ends, and was involved in helping a Russian spy, Vorontsov, escape from France.
Duc d'Orléans (オリアンス, Oriansu)
Voiced by: Ryusaku Chijiwa (Japanese); Jason Douglas (English)
Duke of Orleans and brother of Louis XIV, making him Louis XV's uncle. In the anime he has dark hair and wears a flashy red coat. At one time in the anime he calls Louis as inferior to his father, though the king retorts with a joke instead. Marquise de Pompadour once said that d'Orléans can make the people of France love him, but he himself does not understand them. Though he was stripped of his title early in the anime, he is far from defeated, managing to even capture D'Eon near the end of the series. This character is loosely based on Philippe II, Duke of Orléans.
Comte de Saint-Germain (サン・ジェルマン, San・Jeruman)
Voiced by: Yasunori Matsumoto (Japanese); Paul Hope (English)
A Poet working under the Duc d'Orléans. He issues orders both through mouth and a journal he writes into, the words will then appear in the other copies his followers carry. He confronts Queen Marie and tries to use the Psalms to kill her but he underestimated her power and fell to the combined power of her and the newly arrived Maximilien who betrays him. However he survives and retreats to his hideout where he contacts Lorrenza and Count Cagliostro. He is betrayed and crushed by rocks, but survives and even transforms to a gargoyle. He is defeated by both Louis and D'Eon/Lia. Loosely based on Comte de Saint-Germain.
Caron (カロン, Karon)
Voiced by: Hideyuki Umezu (Japanese); Rob Mungle (English)
A Poet working under Comte de Saint-Germain. When he was caught by D'Eon's group, Durand tortured him in an attempt to get information. Eventually he was released, and he returned to his 'masters' - which included Duc d'Orléans - only to be whipped and have his loyalty questioned. Afterwards, he attacked D'Eon, but is killed by Lia. His dying words curses the rich for ignoring the poor, and promises a change in France.
Maximilien Robespierre (マクシミリアン・ロベスピエール, Makushimirian・Robesupieeru)
Voiced by: Takahiro Sakurai (Japanese); Amit Patel (English)
A Poet with personal relations to Durand and Lia de Beaumont, he is first seen leaving France with the Russian spy Vorontsov. Formerly a French secret agent, he turned against the King shortly before Lia's death. In the anime he frequently asks Durand to join his Revolutionary Order and taunts D'Eon for being the vessel of Lia. He and Lia were both lovers, until they both found out to be half-siblings both sharing the same father. He is usually calm and emotionless, wielding the Psalms almost apathetically but powerfully. While he could not convince Durand or D'Eon into turning against the King, eventually Robin follows his ideals and even takes his name. He is the true member of the royal family.
Vorontsov (ボロンゾフ, Boronzofu)
Voiced by: Keiichi Sonobe (Japanese); Paul Oddo (English)
A Russian spy under the protection of the Duc d'Orléans. He is rather stout and has a long beard, but is also a talented swordsmen. To get to France he poses as a fur trader. At one time when he caught D'Eon trailing after him, he asked whether D'Eon was one of 'her' relatives, then dismisses the question as D'Eon "looks exactly like her". Despite being part of a plot to assassinate the Russian Empress, he seems to grieve her death, and genuinely wishes to do good for his country. Loosely based on Alexander Vorontsov.
Count Cagliostro (カリオストロ, Kariosutoro)
Voiced by: Nobuyuki Kobushi (Japanese); John Gremillion (English)
Part-time peddler, part-time alchemist working under Comte de Saint-Germain, his real name is Giuseppe Balsamo and was first seen selling perfumes in Russia. A rather aloof and debaucherous man, Cagliostro has acquired a taste for fine liquor wherever he goes. He describes his life as a 'comedy on stage', and tells Lorenza that he will create 'a high class tragedy' instead. Later he switches alliances, betraying Saint-Germain and working for Maximillien. At the anime series' end, when Robin takes up Maximillien's name to lead a revolution, he is seen standing behind him supportively. Based on the historical figure Alessandro Cagliostro.
Lorenza (ロレンツィア, Rorentsia)
Voiced by: Kaori Nazuka (Japanese); Lesley Tesh (English)
Lorenza, a Poet and Cagliostro's alluring partner, though he seems far more interested in wine than in her. Despite her demure appearance, Lorenza is not above being ruthless in using the power of the Psalms to bind or kill anyone who stands in her way. Psalms have been seen on her body, which she can use to control animals. Through the anime she is given more power, though she still remains inferior to Lia's spirit. At the end of the series she is seen standing behind Robin as he takes up Maximillien's name and leads the Revolutionary Order. She was based on the historical Lorenza Feliciani, who was Alessandro Cagliostro's wife.
Bernis (ベルニス, Berunisu)
Voiced by: Kenji Hamada (Japanese); Andrew Love (English)
A Parisian secret police inspector, and D'Eon's friend. Bernis eventually falls victim to the Poet's gargoyle transformation, and is forced to attack D'Eon early on in the story. As D'Eon struggles in their swordfight, Lia takes over for the first time and kills him. At first, D'Eon mistakenly believed he killed him and mourns greatly.

== England ==
Queen Mary Charlotte (メアリー=シャロット, Marii-Sharotto)
Voiced by: Mayo Suzukaze (Japanese); Melissa Davis (English)
Queen of Great Britain, wife of George III. She was friends with Lia and recognized her when D'Eon was in another disguise. She is loosely based on Charlotte of Mecklenburg-Strelitz.
King George III (ジョージ三世, Jōji san sei)
Voiced by: Yoshihisa Kawahara (Japanese); Blake McMahon (English)
The King of Great Britain and husband of Queen Mary. He is as calm as King Louis, though younger, and it is revealed that he helped back the Revolutionary Order so that he could restore absolute authority back to the Kings. Based on George III.
Comte de Guercy (ゲルシイ, Gerushii)
Voiced by: Bon Ishihara (Japanese); Ernie Manouse (English)
The French ambassador to England, and Durand's old friend. Guercy is a bit of a drunkard, and his loyalty appears to go to whoever pays him the largest amount of gold. He does not carry much pride for his country, though he does keep a painting of Versailles. According to Ozaki, Guercy was designed based on Jack Black in School of Rock.
Robert Wood (ロバート・ウッド, Robaato・Uddo)
Voiced by: Satoshi Tsuruoka (Japanese); Paul Sidello (English)
The British Undersecretary of State for Foreign Affairs. He does not trust foreigners, though he admires Teillagory for his swordsmen skills.
Dashwood (ダッシュウッド, Daashuuddo)
Voiced by: Takaya Hashi (Japanese); Vic Mignogna (English)
A Poet and the abbot of Medmenham Abbey, founder of the Hellfire Club. His power and influence is so great that even Maximillien bows to him, and he is revealed to be the one who taught Maximillien how to use the Psalms. He is loosely based on the historical figure, Francis Dashwood.
Whitehead (ホワイトヘッド, Howaitoheddo)
Administrator of the Hellfire Club, and is a mute. Described as Dashwood's eyes, he is usually found at the man's side and is very skilled with the use of Psalms. Unfortunately he is not as strong as Maximillien, who uses the same Psalms to kill him.
Earl of Sandwich (サンドウィッチ, Sandowicchi)
Voiced by: Hideyuki Umezu (Japanese); Brandon Hearnsberger (English)
Co-Founder of the Hellfire Club and English Secretary of State. He is loosely based on John Montagu, 4th Earl of Sandwich. He is a close confidant of King George, though the same cannot be said for the Queen.

== Russia ==
Tsaritsa Elizaveta (エリザヴェータ, Erizeviita)
Voiced by: Atsuko Tanaka (Japanese); Alice Fulks (English)
Empress of Russia, and a close friend of Lia's. She is described to be extravagant, and is first shown refusing jewels due to their small size. In order to meet her, D'Eon and Robin entered a cross-dressing ball, and D'Eon's disguise as Lia effectively draws her attention. Inspired by Lia, whose portrait still hangs in the palace, Elizaveta has hopes of reforming Russia, especially with a women's social status. It was briefly mentioned that during her reign, she abolished the death penalty. Loosely based on Tsaritsa Elizabeth.
Ekaterina (エカテリーナ, Ekateriina)
Voiced by: Sachiko Takaguchi (Japanese); Jessica Boone (English)
Wife of Pyotr III, and friend of Empress Elizaveta. She learns of an assassination plot against the Empress and does her best to warn the French spies. When the Empress is killed, she works with D'Eon to seize power from her husband. Her character is loosely based on Tsaritsa Catherine II.
Pyotr III (ピョートル三世, Pyōtoru san sei)
Voiced by: Masatoshi Iida (Japanese); Jose Diaz (English)
Ekaterina's abusive husband and heir to the Russian throne. He is alcoholic and always seem drunk, even when in meetings discussing assassinations. He has a morbid fascination with strangling rats and playing with toy soldiers. Loosely based on Peter III of Russia.
Bestuzhev (ベストゥージェフ, Besutujefu)
Voiced by: Kazuhiko Nishimoto (Japanese); Chris Hutchison (English)
The grand chancellor of Russia; loosely based on Bestuzhev-Ryumin. From early on the Empress suspected him of treason, and he has been proven to be protecting Vorontsov. He does however seem to dislike Cagliostro, loath and fear Lia, and is paranoid of his own partners, mainly because he does not like or trust foreigners. He has fanatical pride for Russia and has a prejudiced hatred of women.
