= The Pen and the Sword =

The title The Pen and the Sword may refer to:

- an episode of The Count of Monte Cristo (1956 TV series)
- a 2005 mixtape by Flipsyde
- an online exhibition of Alexander Bogen at Yad Vashem
- a book by David Barsamian
- a disc by Attila the Stockbroker
- The Pen and the Sword: Studies in Bulgarian History by James Franklin Clarke Jr.
- a book by Michael Foot

== See also ==
- The pen is mightier than the sword
- Pen and Sword Books
- By Pen and Sword, a 1963 novel by Russian writer Valentin Pikul
- The Chinese four-character idiom 文武雙全 ( wén [literature] wǔ [military] shuāng quán [have both]; simplified: 武双全) is commonly translated as "to be good at both the arts of writing and fighting/warring"; "to be master of pen and sword"; "to be well-versed in both letters and martial arts"
- Bunbu-ryōdō: the Japanese four-character idiom 文武両道 (Bun [literature] bu [military] ryō dō [both roads]) has the same meaning as the Chinese one
