= Charles-François =

Charles-François is a given name. Notable people with the name include:

- Charles-François de Broglie, marquis de Ruffec (1719–1791), French soldier and diplomat
- Charles-François Lebrun, duc de Plaisance (1739–1824), Third Consul of France
