= Bestuzhev =

Bestuzhev (Russian: Бecтужeв) or Bestuzheva (feminine; Бecтужeвa) may refer to:

- Bestuzhev (surname), a Russian surname, including a list of people with the name
- Bestuzhev (cattle), a cattle breed from Russia
- Bestuzhev Courses, a women's higher education institution in Imperial Russia.
