= Ryumin =

Ryumin (Russian: Рюмин) is a Russian masculine surname, its feminine counterpart is Ryumina. It may refer to

- Bestuzhev-Ryumin (disambiguation)
- Mikhail Ryumin (1913–1954), Deputy Head of the Soviet Ministry of State Security
- Valery Ryumin (1939–2022), Soviet cosmonaut
