= Bestuzhev-Ryumin =

Bestuzhev-Ryumin (Russian: Бестужев-Рюмин) is a Russian masculine surname, its feminine counterpart is Bestuzheva-Ryumina. It may refer to

- Alexey Bestuzhev-Ryumin (1693–1768), Grand Chancellor of Russia, son of Pyotr
- Konstantin Bestuzhev-Ryumin (1829–1897), Russian historian, nephew of Mikhail
- Mikhail Bestuzhev-Ryumin (1801–1826), Russian officer, an organizer of the Decembrist revolt
- Mikhail Petrovich Bestuzhev-Ryumin (1688–1760), Russian diplomat, son of Pyotr and elder brother of Aleksey
- Pyotr Bestuzhev-Ryumin (1664–1742), Russian statesman

== See also ==
- Bestuzhev (surname)
- Ryumin
