= By Plume and Sword =

By Plume and Sword or By Pen and by Sword (Russian: Пером и шпагой) is a novel by the Soviet writer Valentin Pikul, written in 1963 and first published in 1972. It describes secret diplomacy during the Seven Years' War and the reign of Elizabeth of Russia. Its central character is the Chevalier d'Eon.

In 2008, a miniseries based on the novel was broadcast on Russian television in twelve 45-minute episodes.
