= Chevalière d'Éon =

French diplomat, spy and soldier (1728–1810)

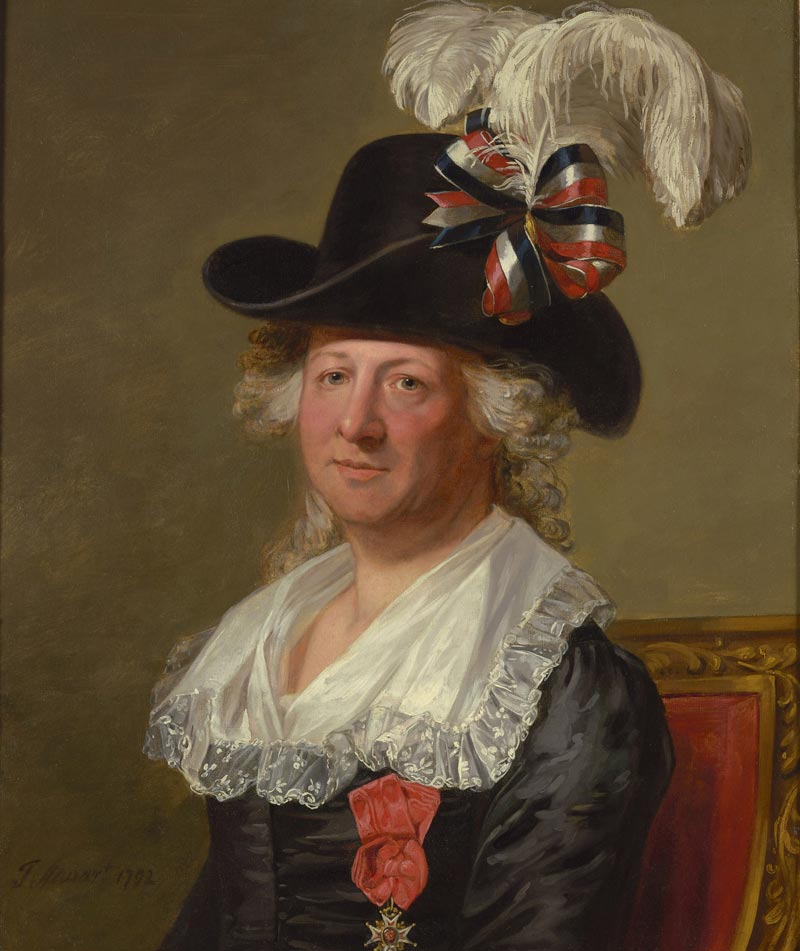
- Chevalier d'Éon wearing the chivalric Order of Saint Louis, a military honour of the Kingdom of France. Painting by Thomas Stewart (1792), at the National Portrait Gallery, London
- Born: 5 October 1728; Tonnerre, Burgundy, France
- Died: 21 May 1810 (aged 81); London, England
- Resting place: St Pancras Old Church

Charlotte d'Éon de Beaumont (Note: Full name Charlotte-Geneviève-Louise-Augusta-Andréa-Timothéa d'Éon de Beaumont or Charles-Geneviève-Louis-Auguste-André-Timothée d'Éon de Beaumont) (5 October 1728 – 21 May 1810), usually known as the Chevalière d'Éon or the Chevalier d'Éon, (Note: chevalière is the female equivalent of chevalier, meaning knight) was a French diplomat, spy, and soldier. D'Éon fought in the Seven Years' War, and spied for France while in Russia and England. Assigned male at birth, D'Éon had androgynous physical characteristics and natural abilities as a mimic and spy. She appeared publicly as a man and pursued masculine occupations for the first half of her life, except for when she successfully infiltrated the court of Empress Elizabeth of Russia by presenting as a woman. Starting in 1777, d'Éon lived as a woman and was officially recognised as such by King Louis XVI.

== Early life, family, and education ==
D'Éon was born Charles d'Éon de Beaumont at the Hôtel d'Uzès in Tonnerre, Burgundy, into a poor French noble family. Her father, Louis d'Éon de Beaumont, was an attorney and director of the king's dominions, then later mayor of Tonnerre and sub-delegate of the intendant of the généralité of Paris. Her mother, Françoise de Charanton, was the daughter of a Commissioner General to the armies of the wars of Spain and Italy.

Most of what is known about d'Éon's early life comes from The Interests of the Chevalier d'Éon de Beaumont, a partly ghost-written autobiography, and from Bram Stoker's essay in his 1910 book Famous Impostors.

D'Éon excelled in school, moving from Tonnerre to Paris in 1743. She graduated in civil and canon law from the Collège Mazarin in 1749 at the age of 21.

== Career ==
D'Éon began literary work as a contributor to Élie Catherine Fréron's Année littéraire, and attracted notice as a political writer through two works on financial and administrative questions, published in 1753. She became secretary to Bertier de Sauvigny, intendant of Paris, served as a secretary to the administrator of the fiscal department, and was appointed a royal censor for history and literature by Malesherbes in 1758.

== Life as a spy ==
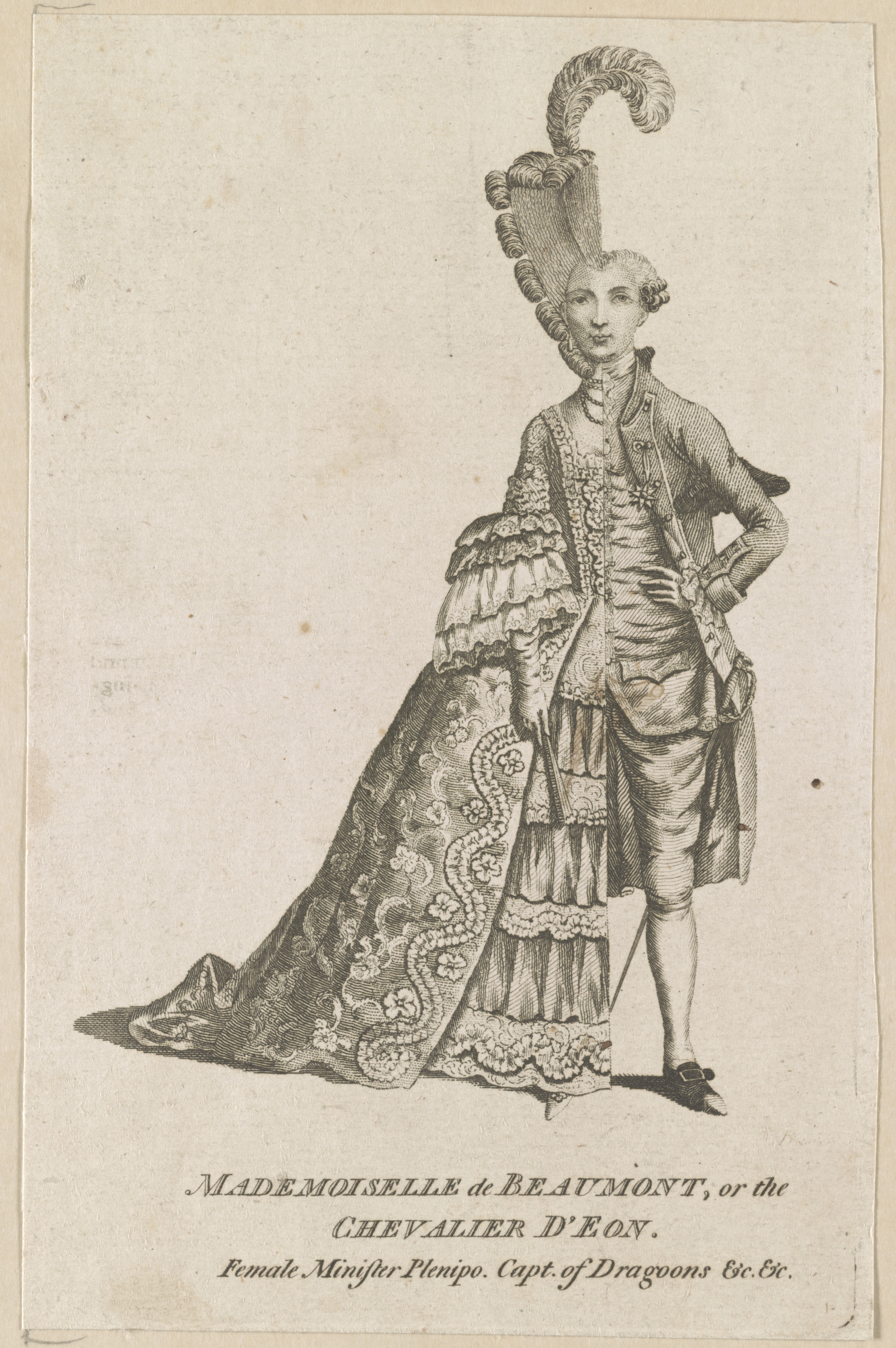
Caricature of d'Éon dressed half in women's clothes, half in men's clothes

In 1756, d'Éon joined the secret network of spies called the Secret du Roi ('King's Secret'), employed by King Louis XV without the knowledge of the government. It sometimes promoted policies that were contrary to official policies and treaties. According to her memoirs, the monarch sent d'Éon with the Chevalier Douglas, Alexander Peter Mackenzie Douglas, Baron of Kildin, a Scottish Jacobite in French service, on a secret mission to Russia in order to meet Empress Elizabeth and conspire with the pro-French faction against the Habsburg monarchy. This is not confirmed by any contemporary sources. At that time the English and French were at odds, and the English were attempting to deny the French access to the Empress by allowing only women and children to cross the border into Russia. D'Éon later claimed that she had to pass convincingly as a woman or risk being executed by the English upon discovery, and therefore travelled disguised as the lady Lia de Beaumont, serving as a maid of honour to the Empress. However, there is little or no evidence to support this and it is now commonly accepted to be a story told to demonstrate how d'Éon's identification as female had been of benefit to France in the past. Eventually, Chevalier Douglas became the French ambassador to Russia, and d'Éon was secretary to the embassy in Saint Petersburg from 1756 to 1760, serving Douglas and his successor, the Marquis of l'Hôpital.

D'Éon returned to France in October 1760, and was granted a pension of 2,000 livres as a reward for her service in Russia. In May 1761, d'Éon became a captain of dragoons under Marshal de Broglie and fought in the later stages of the Seven Years' War. She served at the Battle of Villinghausen in July 1761, and was wounded at Ultrop. After Empress Elizabeth died in January 1762, d'Éon was considered for further service in Russia, but she instead was appointed secretary to the Duke of Nevers, awarded 1,000 livres, and sent to London to draft the peace treaty that formally ended the Seven Years' War. The treaty was signed in Paris on 10 February 1763, and d'Éon was awarded a further 6,000 livres. She received the Order of Saint-Louis on 30 March 1763, becoming the Chevalier d'Éon. The title chevalier, French for 'knight', is often used for French noblemen.

Back in London, d'Éon became chargé d'affaires in April 1763, and then plenipotentiary minister—essentially interim ambassador—when the duc de Nivernais returned to Paris in July. D'Éon used this position to spy for the king. She collected information for a potential French invasion of Britain—an unfortunate and clumsy initiative of Louis XV, of which Louis's own ministers were unaware—assisting a French agent, Louis François Carlet de La Rozière, who was surveying the British coastal defences. D'Éon formed connections with English nobility by sending them the produce of her vineyard in France; she abundantly enjoyed the splendour of this interim embassy.

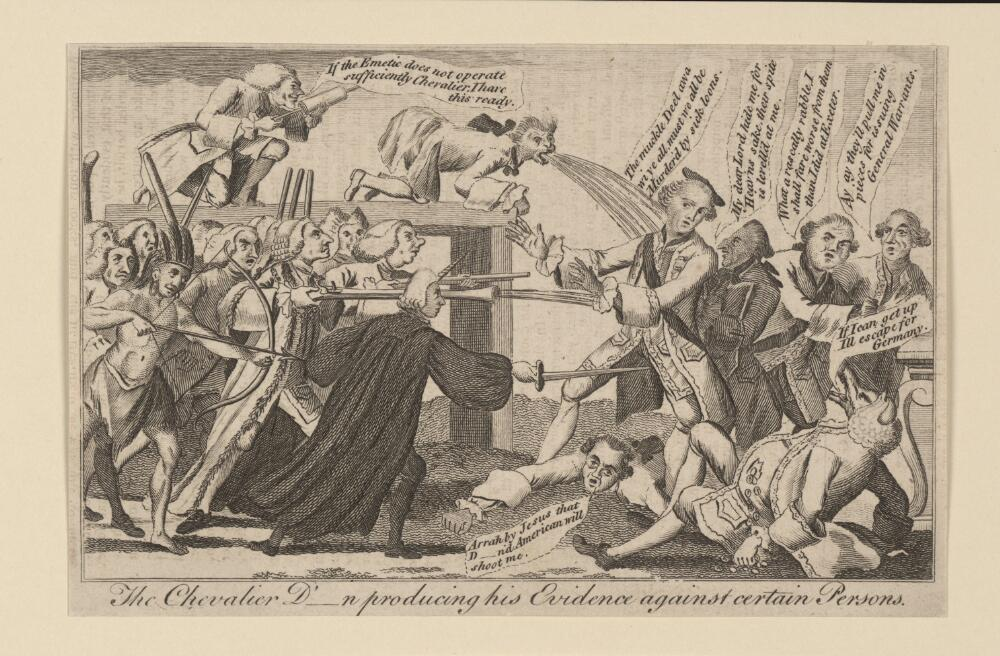
Caricature by Charles Benjamin Incledon of d'Éon "producing [...] evidence against certain persons"

Upon the arrival of the new ambassador, the Count of Guerchy, in October 1763, d'Éon was demoted to the rank of secretary and humiliated by the count. D'Éon was trapped between two French factions: Guerchy was a supporter of the Duke of Choiseul, Duke of Praslin and Madame de Pompadour, in opposition to the Count of Broglie and his brother the Marshal de Broglie. She complained, and eventually decided to disobey orders to return to France. In a letter to the king, d'Éon claimed that the new ambassador had tried to drug her at a dinner at the ambassador's residence in Monmouth House in Soho Square. The British government declined a French request to extradite d'Éon, and the 2,000 livres pension that had been granted in 1760 was stopped in February 1764. In an effort to save her station in London, d'Éon published much of the secret diplomatic correspondence about her recall under the title Lettres, mémoires et négociations particulières du chevalier d'Éon in March 1764, disavowing Guerchy and calling him unfit for the job. This breach of diplomatic discretion was scandalous to the point of being unheard of, but d'Éon had not yet published everything (the King's secret invasion documents and those relative to the Secret du Roi were kept back as "insurance"), so the French government became cautious in its dealings with her, even when she sued Guerchy for attempted murder. D'Éon did not offer any defence when Guerchy countersued for libel. She was declared an outlaw and went into hiding. However, d'Éon secured the sympathy of the British public: the mob jeered Guerchy, and threw stones at his residence. D'Éon then wrote a book on public administration, Les loisirs du Chevalier d'Éon, which she published in thirteen volumes in Amsterdam in 1774.

Guerchy was recalled to France, and in July 1766 Louis XV granted d'Éon a pension (possibly a pay-off for d'Éon's silence) and a 12,000-livre annuity, but refused a demand for over 100,000 livres to clear d'Éon's extensive debts. D'Éon continued to work as a spy, but lived in political exile in London. D'Éon's possession of the king's secret letters provided protection against further actions, but d'Éon could not return to France in safety. D'Éon became a Freemason in 1768, and was initiated at London's Immortality Lodge.

== Later life ==
The Chevalière d'Éon

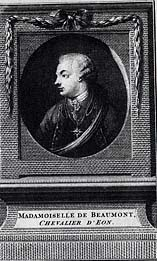
The Chevalier d'Éon

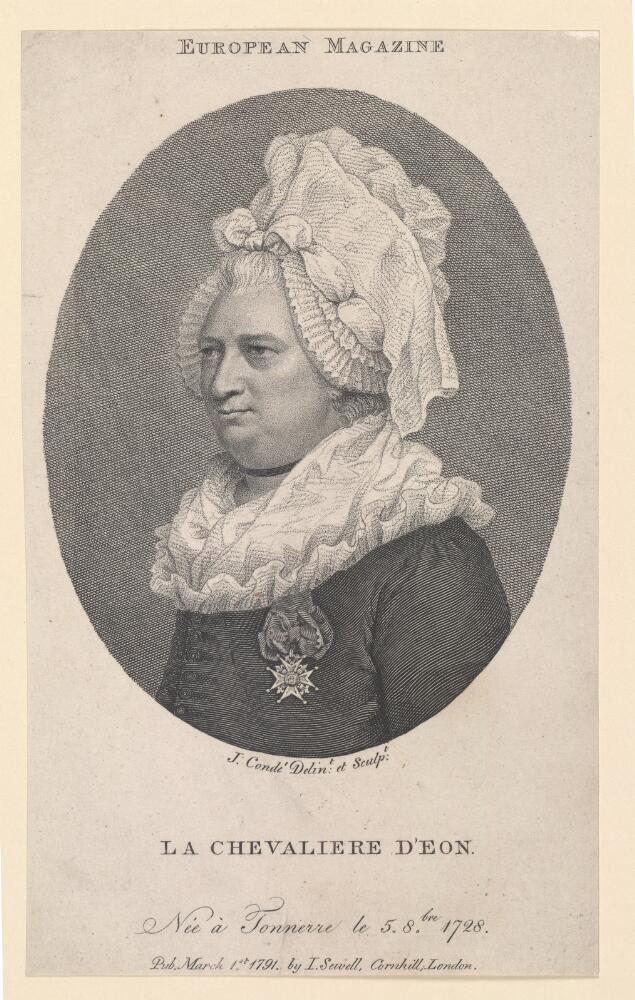
The Chevalière d'Éon (older)

Despite the fact that d'Éon habitually wore a dragoon's uniform, rumours circulated in London that d'Éon was actually a woman. A betting pool was started on the London Stock Exchange about d'Éon's true gender. She was invited to join, but declined, saying that an examination would be dishonouring, whatever the result. After a year without progress, the wager was abandoned. Following the death of Louis XV in 1774, the Secret du Roi was abolished, and d'Éon tried to negotiate a return from exile. The writer Pierre de Beaumarchais represented the French government in the negotiations. The resulting twenty-page treaty permitted d'Éon to return to France and retain the ministerial pension, but required that d'Éon turn over the correspondence regarding the Secret du Roi.

Madame Campan writes in her memoirs: "This eccentric being had long solicited permission to return to France; but it was necessary to find a way of sparing the family he had offended the insult they would see in his return; he was therefore made to resume the costume of that sex to which in France everything is pardoned. The desire to see his native land once more determined him to submit to the condition, but he revenged himself by combining the long train of his gown and the three deep ruffles on his sleeves with the attitude and conversation of a grenadier, which made him very disagreeable company."

The Chevalière d'Éon claimed to have been assigned female at birth, and demanded recognition by the government as such. D'Éon claimed to have been raised as a boy because her father, Louis d'Éon de Beaumont, could inherit from his in-laws only if he had a son. King Louis XVI and his court complied with this demand, but required in turn that d'Éon dress appropriately in women's clothing, although she was allowed to continue to wear the insignia of the Order of Saint-Louis. When the king's offer included funds for a new wardrobe of women's clothes, d'Éon agreed. In 1777, after fourteen months of negotiation, d'Éon returned to France and as punishment was banished to Tonnerre.

Once King Louis's agreement was reached with d'Éon, reports of d'Éon leaving Britain reached the public. These reports sparked legal cases pertaining to unresolved wagers to be filed. This led to Chief Justice William Murray, 1st Earl of Mansfield, to legally pronounce d'Éon as female under English law.

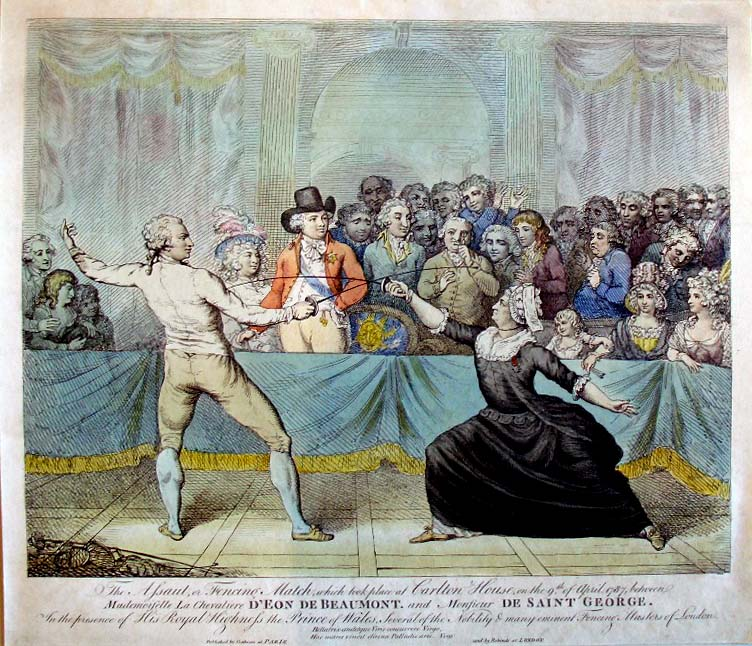
Fencing match between Monsieur de Saint-George and Mademoiselle La chevalière d'Éon de Beaumont at Carlton House on 9 April 1787. Engraving by Victor Marie Picot, based on the original painting by Abbé Alexandre-Auguste Robineau (below).

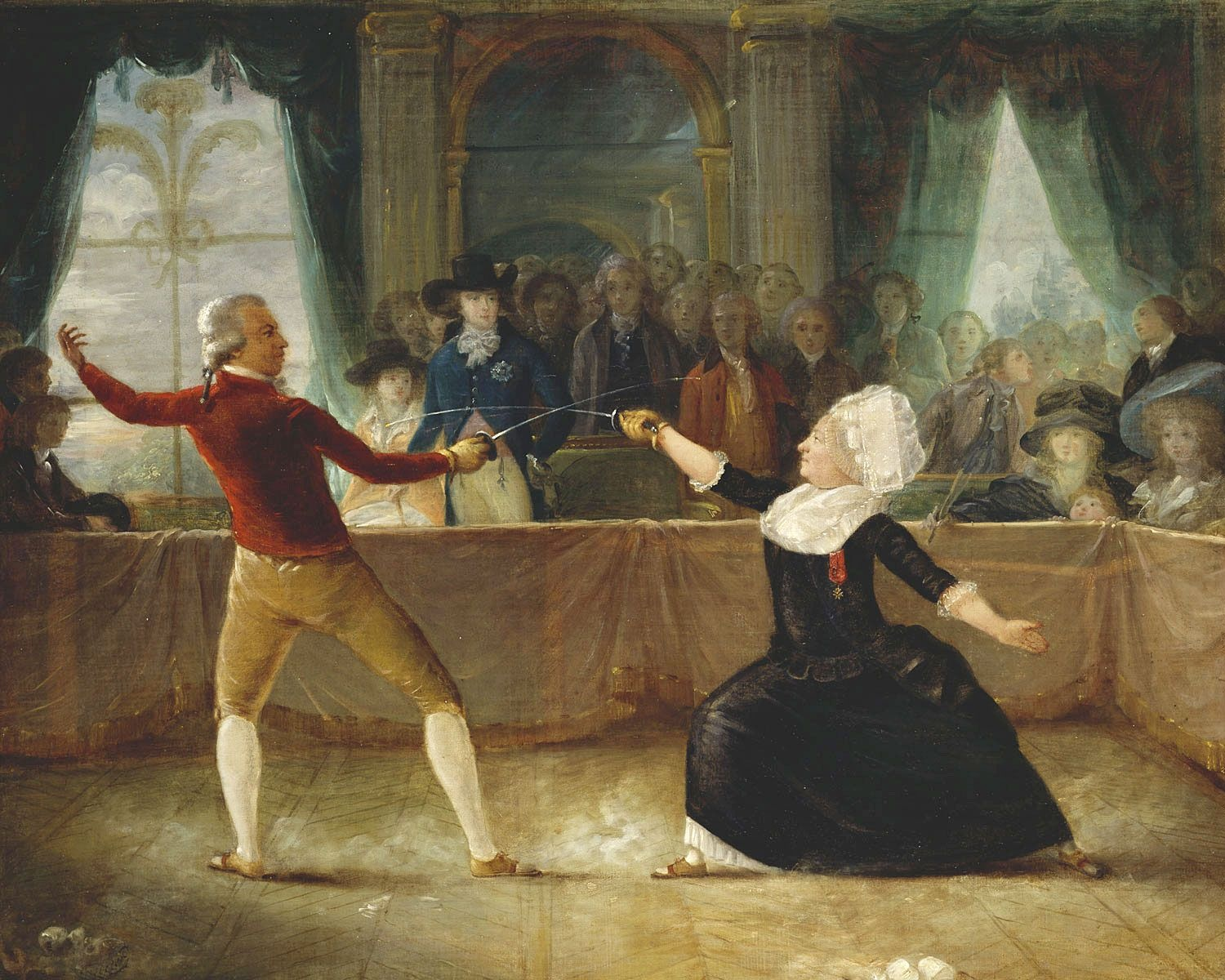

When France began to help the rebels during the American War of Independence, d'Éon asked to join the French troops in America, but d'Éon's banishment prevented it. In 1779, d'Éon published a book of memoirs: La Vie Militaire, politique, et privée de Mademoiselle d'Éon. They were ghostwritten by a friend named La Fortelle and are probably embellished. D'Éon was allowed to return to England in 1785.

The pension that Louis XV had granted was ended by the French Revolution, and d'Éon had to sell personal possessions, including books, jewellery and plate. The family's properties in Tonnerre were confiscated by the revolutionary government. In 1792, d'Éon sent a letter to the French National Assembly offering to lead a division of female soldiers against the Habsburgs, but the offer was rebuffed. After this, she participated in fencing tournaments until being seriously wounded in Southampton in 1796. In her last years, d'Éon lived with a widow, Mrs. Cole. In 1804, she was sent to a debtors' prison for five months, and signed a contract for a biography to be written by Thomas William Plummer, which was never published. She became paralysed following a fall, and spent a final four years bedridden, dying in poverty in London on 21 May 1810 at the age of 81.

The surgeon who examined d'Éon's body attested in the post-mortem certificate that she had "male organs in every respect perfectly formed", while at the same time displaying feminine characteristics. A couple of characteristics described in the certificate were "unusual roundness in the formation of limbs", as well as "breast remarkably full".

D'Éon's body was buried in the churchyard of St Pancras Old Church, and her remaining possessions were sold by Christie's in 1813. D'Éon's grave is listed on the Burdett-Coutts Memorial there as one of the important graves lost.

== Legacy ==
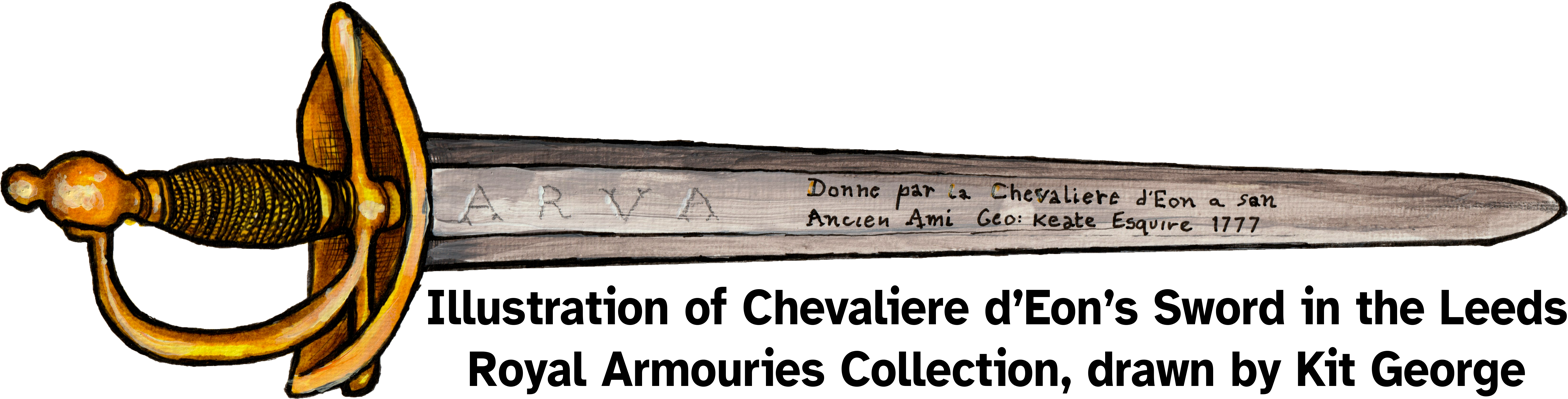
Illustration of Chevalier D'eon's sword by Kit George

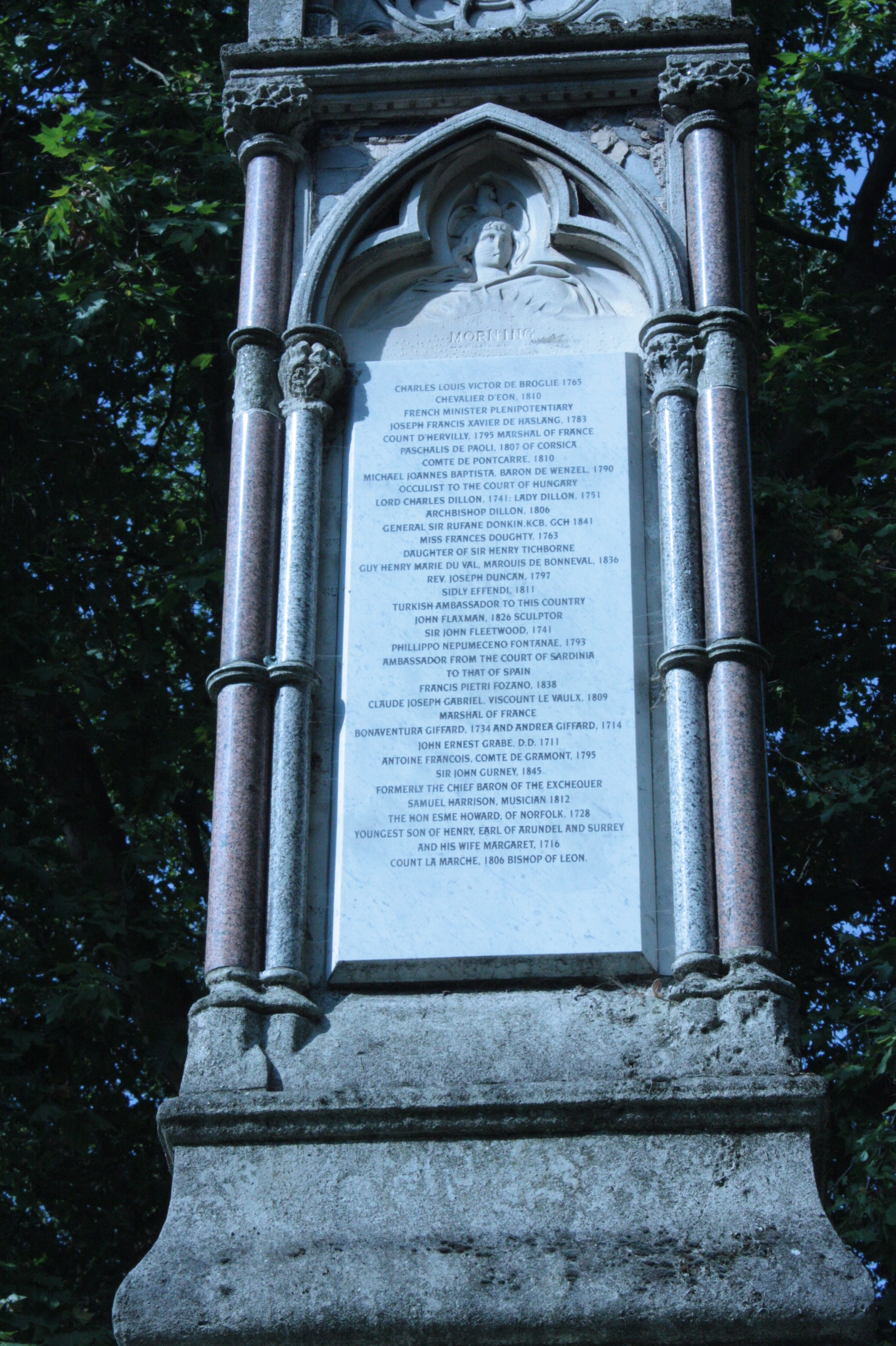
D'Éon's name listed on the south face of the Burdett-Coutts Memorial

A presentation sword belonging to d'Éon and gifted by its owner to George Keate in 1777 is on display at the Royal Armouries in Leeds. The blade is inscribed in French: 'Donne par la Chevalïere d’Eon à son ancïen Ami Geo: Keate Esquïre. 1777'. Some of d'Éon's papers are at the Brotherton Library at the University of Leeds, including a number of letters from Keate.

Many modern scholars have interpreted d'Éon as transgender. Havelock Ellis coined the term eonism to describe similar cases of transgender behaviour, but the term is rarely used now. The Beaumont Society, a long-standing organisation for transgender people, is named after d'Éon.

In 2012, a 1792 painting (shown above) by Thomas Stewart was identified as a portrait of d'Éon, and was purchased by the National Portrait Gallery, London.

The Burdett-Coutts Memorial at St Pancras Gardens in London commemorates d'Éon as well as other people; in 2016 Historic England upgraded it to a Grade II* listed structure.

=== Cultural depictions ===
The Chevalier d'Éon has appeared as a character in numerous fictional works and music.

- The Chevalière d'Eon, by Charles Dupeuty and the Baron de Maldigny (1837), Théâtre du Vaudeville
- The Chevalier d'Eon, a comedy in three acts by Dumanoir and Jean-François Bayard (1837), Théâtre des Variétés
- Le chevalier d'Eon, an opéra comique in four acts by Rodolphe Berger, libretto by Armand Silvestre and Henri Cain (1908), Théâtre de la Porte Saint-Martin; Anne Dancrey created the title role
- Spy of Madame Pompadour (1928), film
- Le secret du Chevalier d'Éon (1959), a film loosely based on the life of the Chevalier that portrays d'Éon as a woman masquerading as a man
- By Plume and Sword (Пером и шпагой), a novel by the Soviet writer Valentin Pikul, written in 1963 and first published in 1972, based on d'Éon's career in Russia
- Le Chevalier D'Eon (2006), an anime series loosely based on the Chevalier d'Éon
- Beaumarchais (1996), a BBC radio drama about Pierre de Beaumarchais, where the Chevalier d'Eon/Lia de Beaumont appears in the third episode, titled Femme Fatale. The role is played by Bill Nighy.
- Assassin's Creed Unity (2014) video game
