= Bestuzhev (surname) =

Bestuzhev (Russian: Бecтужeв), or Bestuzheva (feminine; Бecтужeвa) is a Russian surname. The Bestuzhev noble family was from the medieval Novgorod Republic and descended from boyars.

Notable people with the surname include:

- Pyotr Bestuzhev-Ryumin (1664–1742), Russian statesman
- Mikhail Petrovich Bestuzhev-Ryumin (1688–1760), Russian diplomat
- Alexey Bestuzhev-Ryumin (1693–1766), Russian diplomat
- Alexander Fedoseyevich Bestuzhev (1761–1810), Russian writer and state councilor
- Alexander's sons (all members of the Decembrist revolt):
  - Nikolay Bestuzhev (1791–1855), Russian writer and portrait painter
  - Alexander Bestuzhev (1797–1837), Russian writer
  - Mikhail Bestuzhev (writer) (1800–1871), Russian writer
  - Pyotr Bestuzhev (officer) (1804–1840), Russian officer and memoirist
  - Pavel Bestuzhev (1808–1846), Russian officer
- Mikhail Bestuzhev-Ryumin (1801–1826), Russian officer
- Konstantin Bestuzhev-Ryumin (1829–1897), Russian historian
