= Secret du Roi =

Collectively, the secret channels of diplomacy used by King Louis XV

The King's Secret (Secret du Roi or Secret du Roy in French) refers to the secret diplomatic channels used by King Louis XV of France during his reign. For a period of over twenty years, Louis XV split his diplomacy into official and secret channels, the latter designed to advance Louis XV's personal interests at times at odds with official French policy.

Louis XV's secret diplomacy was born from the secret candidacy of the Prince de Conti to the Polish throne, as he could not involve France in that while he was in the middle of the War of Austrian Succession. The secret network originally employed 32 people, led initially by Cardinal Fleury and then by Charles-François de Broglie and Jean-Pierre Tercier. Famous agents included the Chevalier d'Éon, Pierre de Beaumarchais, Charles Théveneau de Morande and Louis de Noailles.

The King's Secret was officially dissolved upon the king's death in 1774; however, in practice, it outlived its creator, and some of its agents were involved in bringing France (and its allies) into the American War of Independence.

A precursor to the King's Secret was in charge of the 1741 palace revolution in Russia that brought to the throne Empress Elizabeth. It included courtier Jacques-Joachim Trotti, marquis de La Chétardie and Elizabeth's personal physician Jean Armand de Lestocq.
