= Charles François de Broglie, Marquis of Ruffec =

French Royal Army officer and diplomat (1719–1781)

Charles François de Broglie
- Marquis of Ruffec
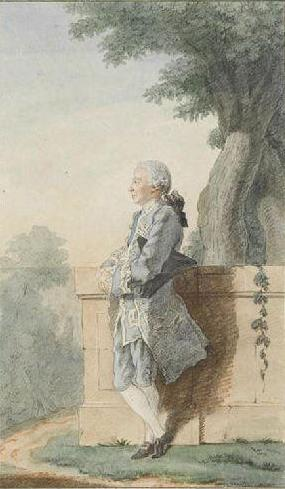
- Portrait by Louis Carrogis Carmontelle, c. 1757–1758

- Coat of arms
- Born: 19 August 1719; Paris, France
- Died: 16 August 1781 (aged 61); Saint-Jean-d'Angély, France
- Buried: Angouleme Cathedral
- Noble family: House of Broglie
- Wife: Louise Augustine de Montmorency
- Issue: Louise; Philippine; Adelaide Charlotte
- Father: François Marie de Broglie, Duke of Broglie
- Mother: Thérèse Gillette Locquet de Grandville
- Occupation: Diplomat; Military officer

Charles François de Broglie, Marquis of Ruffec (French: [ʃaʁl fʁɑ̃swa də bʁɔj]; 19 August 1719 – 16 August 1781) was a French Royal Army officer and diplomat from the House of Broglie. He was one of the foremost diplomats in the service of Louis XV, and is chiefly remembered in connection with the Secret du Roi.

== Biography ==
As second son of François-Marie, duc de Broglie, he was accorded the courtesy title of marquis de Ruffec.

After serving as a French military officer, he was seconded to the diplomatic service of King Louis XV. He served as Ambassador Extraordinary to Poland (1752–56), was recalled at the outbreak of the Seven Years' War, was appointed Chevalier des Ordres du Roi (1757), Lieutenant-General (1760), Commandant of Franche-Comté (1761–62), then after the Peace, Governor of Saumurois (1770). He is best remembered in connection with the Secret du Roi, the private—as distinct from the official—diplomatic service of Louis XV, of which he was the ablest and most important member. He held the post of Premier Colonel of Grenadiers.

The Marquis organized the famous Diner de Metz (8 August 1775), when the young Marquis de La Fayette was convinced by the guest of honour, the visiting Duke of Gloucester, brother of King George III, that the insurgents' revolt in America was in some measure justified. Broglie-Ruffec was involved with Beaumarchais in devising a scheme to offer secret support to the American Revolution in its early stages.

His funeral monument is in the Angouleme Cathedral and a portrait of him, painted by Norman-Michel-Hubert Descours in 1762, is at the Château de Bourdeilles.

== Marriage ==
He married, 21 March 1759, Louise Augustine de Montmorency (1735–1817); they had three daughters.

== Children ==
1. Louise (1760–1827)
2. Philippine de Broglie (1762–1843)
3. Adelaide Charlotte de Broglie 1763–1847.

== See also ==
- List of Ambassadors of France to the Kingdom of Great Britain
