= Festival International de Musique Saint-Georges =

Classical music festival in Guadeloupe

Festival International de Musique Saint-Georges Saint-Georges International Music Festival
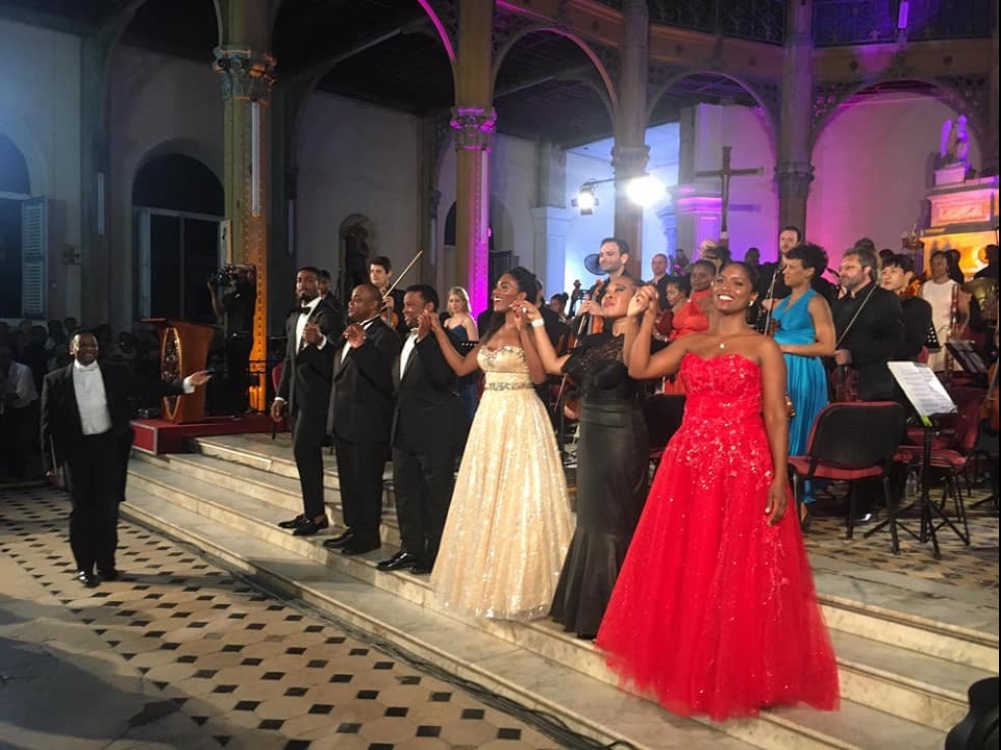
- Église Saint-Pierre-et-Saint-Paul de Pointe-à-Pitre, performance in 2019
- Genre: Classical music
- Frequency: Biennial
- Locations: Guadeloupe, France
- Inaugurated: 2018
- People: Marlon Daniel; Koh Gabriel Kameda; Magali Léger; Fred Onovwerosuoke
- Website: festivalsaintgeorges.com

The Festival International de Musique Saint-Georges (also known in English as: Saint-Georges International Music Festival or Festival Saint-Georges) is a prominent music festival held in Guadeloupe, celebrating the life and works of Joseph Bologne, Le Chevalier de Saint-Georges. It had its inaugural launch in 2011 and has since become one of the largest classical music festivals in the Caribbean.

== Purpose ==
According to the festival's website and press releases, the festival has three goals:

- Celebrate the life and music of Joseph Bologne, Le Chevalier de Saint-Georges, a contemporary of Mozart and one of the earliest known composers of African origin.
- Promote diversity in classical music by bringing together exceptional artists from a variety of backgrounds and ethnicity.
- Provide opportunities for under-represented artists (performers, composers, educators and students) to develop their talent and receive exposure on an international platform.

== Performances and artists ==
American conductor and renowned Saint-Georges exponent and interpreter, Marlon Daniel has served as the festival's music director and artistic director since its prelude in 2011 and inaugural season in 2018.

The approximately two-week long festival is made up of concerts, lectures, symposiums, education programs and master classes that take place in various parts of the Caribbean, France and the US. The festival features some of the finest composers, performers, and scholars from around the world. Musical selections often feature a variety of classical music, from Saint-Georges' compositions alongside music by his contemporaries in the Classical period, to standard repertoire from the common era. The festival highlights composers of African-origin and diverse backgrounds, including contemporary works specially commissioned for the festival. Composers who have written pieces and had pieces premiered at the festival include Dominique Le Gendre, Fred Onovwerosuoke, Thierry Pécou, Jonathan Grimbert-Barré, Jamshed Turel and Jérome Pfister.

The festival's artists do various outreach programs around the world as part of the festival's mission to spread the music of Saint-Georges. Recent guest artists include Koh Gabriel Kameda, Magali Léger, J'Nai Bridges, Janinah Burnett, Solomon Howard, Darnell Ishmel, Romuald Grimbert-Barré, Chauncey Packer, Léïla Brédent and Eric Silberger.

== History ==
Born in Baillif, Guadeloupe, Saint-Georges is one of the first known composers of African origin, a civil rights activist and legendary hero of the French Revolution. Saint-Georges' extraordinary life has long been a model for creativity, excellence and strength. Several attempts to hold a festival celebrating the life and work of Saint-Georges were made throughout the 1990s and early 2000s, unsuccessfully.

From 2002 to 2010, conductor Marlon Daniel increasingly performed works by Saint-Georges with Ensemble du Monde, his New York City-based chamber orchestra. Interested in seeing greater acknowledgement for Saint-Georges' works, and becoming renowned as a specialist of Saint-Georges, Daniel partnered with French educator Catherine Pizon, and Guadeloupean historian Jean-Claude Halley in April 2011 to offer a celebration of Saint-Georges' music in Guadeloupe. Partnering with local musicians and bringing in international artists from 15 countries, the celebration included concerts, lectures and education programs about Saint-Georges' life.

After the success of the 2011 celebration, Daniel founded the Association Festival International de Musique Saint-Georges to govern and organize the festival's activities. The association was incorporated as a non-profit organization in France in 2016, and a directing board of governors formed. Since 2018 the association received support from the Regional Council of Guadeloupe and Comité du Tourisme des îles de Guadeloupe, as well as other government and private groups, to put on regular festivals in Guadeloupe and around the world. The inaugural season of the Saint-Georges International Music Festival was launched in February 2018, with Marlon Daniel appointed as the festival's ongoing music director and artistic director. Since that time, the festival has brought artists from over 30 countries, and is recognized as an official national festival of Guadeloupe alongside the Guadeloupe International Zouk Festival, International Ilo Jazz Festival, and Route du Rhum festival.

== Académie ==
In 2019 the festival introduced the Académie de Festival International de Musique Saint-Georges. The Academy provides lessons to the Guadeloupe community using the guest artists of the festival. Currently lessons are free and subsidized through various grants, though there is an application and audition process for the academy.

== See also ==
- Music of Guadeloupe
- List of classical music festivals
- Chevalier de Saint-Georges
