= Marlon Daniel =

American musician and conductor

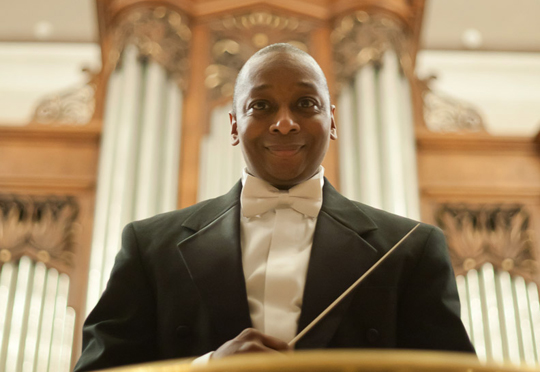
- Born: Chicago, Illinois
- Occupations: Conductor, music director
- Known for: Contemporary classical music, Music of Chevalier de Saint-Georges, Music of African descent

Marlon Daniel is an American conductor, music director, and educator. He is known for his work with the music of Joseph Bologne, Chevalier de Saint-Georges . Daniel was the recipient of the 2009 John and Mary Virginia Foncannon Conducting Award, a prizewinner at the 2018 Bucharest Symphony Orchestra International Conducting Competition and a winner of the 2026 Medal of Honour for Overseas Commitment from the French government.

== Early life ==
Born in Chicago, Illinois, his family is originally from New Orleans, Louisiana, and Atlanta, Georgia, and he is of African American, French and American Indian descent (through maternal grandmother Ruth Chitwood). He received his formative education at St. Ita Grammar School and Lane Technical High School in Chicago. He also studied dance as scholarship student at Boitsov Classical Ballet School and was a member of Najwa Dance Corps. For a brief period he pursued acting as a child and appeared on Sesame Street. He holds two silver medals in competitive jujitsu.

== Education ==
Daniel's talent was first discovered at the age of seven by his father, Michael Daniel, an amateur musician, when he was able without lessons to play his father's pieces on the piano by ear. He received his first piano lessons with Kathryn Gladden, a pupil of Moritz Rosenthal. He continued his elementary music education with Salavatore Spina at the Music Center of the North Shore and the American Conservatory of Music in the Young Artists Program.

With the support of Mayor Harold Washington and Vernon Jarrett, Daniel continued his formal musical education in both the United States and Europe, earning piano degrees from Manhattan School of Music studying with Arkady Aronov and Lev Natochenny, Le Conservatoire Américain "Fontainebleau" (France) with Gaby Casadesus, Centro de Estudios Musicales Isaac Albéniz (Spain) with Dmitri Bashkirov and New York University where he was the last student of renowned Russian piano pedagogue Alexander Edelmann. He studied conducting at the Prague Academy and the Prague Conservatory with Tomáš Koutník and Miriam Němcová.

Daniel is a protégé of Finnish conducting pedagogue Jorma Panula, who has produced talents such as Mikko Franck, Hannu Lintu, Susanna Mälkki, Osmo Vänskä and Esa-Pekka Salonen.

After winning the James and Lola Faust Fellowship in 2007, Daniel spent time with Sir Simon Rattle and the Berlin Philharmonic, and later, Iván Fischer at the Beethovenfest. He has also worked closely with Jiří Bělohlávek, Vladimir Feltsman, David Gilbert, Richard Goode, Nicholai Lomov, Miyoko Nakaya Lotto, Larry Rachleff and Oxana Yablonskaya.

== Musical career ==
Daniel started his musical career as a child prodigy pianist in Chicago, Illinois. Later he worked as a freelance concert artist while studying conducting and piano at Manhattan School of Music. In 1993 he was selected as one of thirteen pianists from around the world to participate in the Gilmore International Keyboard Festival Young Artist Program. He continued to be active as a soloist with orchestra, recitalist and chamber musician in collaboration with noted vocal and instrumental soloists in the United States and Europe.

In 2000, Daniel founded Manhattan Virtuosi and became its music director for the next four years. Increasingly focusing on his conducting career, from 2003 until 2007 he resided predominantly in Europe. During this time he served as associate conductor of the Praga Sinfonietta. After the dissolution of Manhattan Virtuosi, Daniel founded and was music director of the New York-based chamber orchestra Ensemble du Monde in 2004, which brought together virtuoso musicians from around the world, including many former members of Manhattan Virtuosi.

Daniel has subsequently appeared in concert halls throughout the world including Carnegie Hall (New York), Lincoln Center for the Performing Arts (New York), the Rudolfinum (Prague, Czech Republic), Bulgaria Hall (Sofia, Bulgaria), Insular Hall (Alabang, Philippines), Severance Hall (Cleveland), L'Archipel (Basse-Terre, Guadeloupe) and alongside several internationally renowned artists that have included Edward W. Hardy, Deborah Voigt, Julian Milkis, Koh Gabriel Kameda, J'Nai Bridges, Russell Thomas, Norm Lewis, Phylicia Rashad and Magali Léger.

He has also appeared as conductor and music director for several international commercial media ventures that have included the world premiere of a Maybach car at the New York Wall Street Regent Hotel and the world premiere of Nickelodeon Television's Emmy winning Wonder Pets!, "Save the Goldfish" episode live at New York's Javits Center.

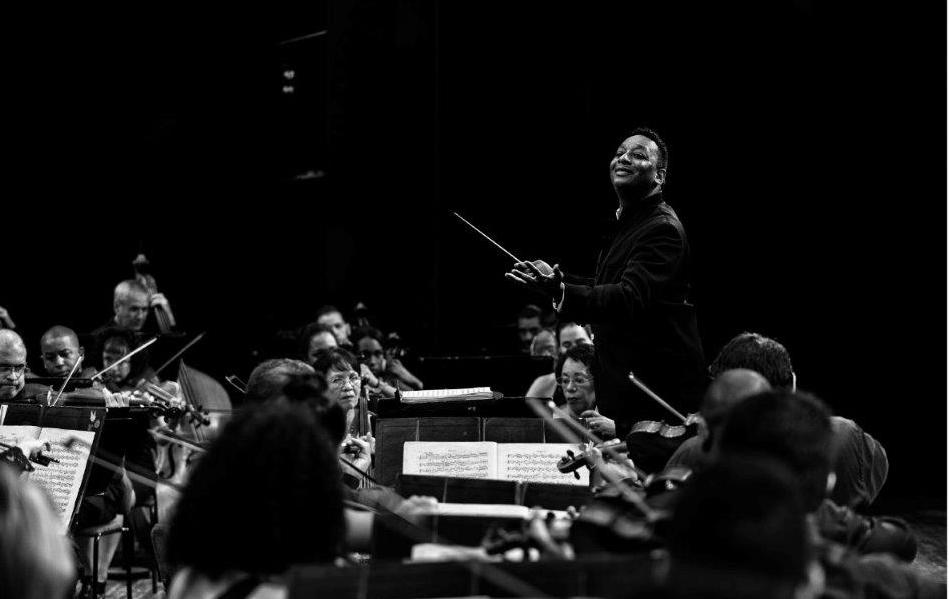
Daniel conducting the Orquesta Sinfónica Nacional de Cuba

In addition to Ensemble du Monde, Daniel is the principal conductor of the New Horizons Orchestra of the Festival of African and African American Music (FESAAM), artistic director of the Festival International de Musique Saint-Georges in Guadeloupe and principal guest conductor (2012–14) of the Sofia Sinfonietta. He has guest-conducted orchestras in the United States, the Caribbean, Czech Republic, Philippines, Germany, France and Russia.

In 2017, Daniel made his debut with the Orquesta Sinfónica Nacional de Cuba, during the period following the restoration of diplomatic relations between the United States and Cuba in 2015. In a 2020 interview with OperaWire, Daniel stated that he was the first American conductor invited to lead the orchestra following the diplomatic rapprochement. He has also conducted the Havana Lyceum Orchestra and continued his collaborations with Cuban musicians.

Daniel has performed new works of Giya Kancheli, George Walker, Matthew Kajcienski, Libby Larsen, Dominique Le Gendre, Fred Onovwerosuoke, Hampson Sisler, Patrick Soluri, Eino Tamberg, Adolphus Hailstork, and Lev Zhurbin. He is credited with conducting the world premieres of Dominique Le Gendre's Le Génie Humain for Orchestra, Fred Onovwerosuoke's Meditation for Darfur for mezzo-soprano, harp and orchestra and Hampson Sisler's Phoenix Forever suite for orchestra, the American premiere of Giya Kancheli's Night Prayers for clarinet, strings and tape, and the Russian premiere of William Grant Still's "Afro-American" Symphony with the Tatarstan State Symphony Orchestra.

Daniel is a renowned exponent of music by composers of African descent. In 2016 he founded the Festival International de Musique Saint-Georges. He continues to serve as the artistic and music director of the festival, and is recognized internationally as one of the world's foremost interpreters of the music of Chevalier de Saint-Georges. He served as the inaugural music director of the Colour of Music Festival in Charleston, South Carolina, continuing in the capacity for three years.

In 2026, Daniel received the French government's Médaille d'honneur de l'engagement ultramarin (Honor Medal for Overseas Commitment) in recognition of his work promoting the music of Joseph Bologne, Chevalier de Saint-Georges, and the cultural heritage of France and the French Caribbean.

He is a member of Mu Phi Epsilon International Professional Music Fraternity and co-chairman of the fraternity's International Committee.

== Awards ==
- Médaille d'honneur de l'engagement ultramarin (Medal of Honor for Overseas Commitment), 2026, French government.
- Prizewinner "Special Talent Award" at the 2018 Bucharest Symphony Orchestra, International Conducting Competition
- International Saint-Georges Award 2011
- Global Association of Women for the Arts, Dove Award for Outstanding Artistic Contributions to Cultural and Humanitarian Causes 2010
- John and Mary Virginia Foncannon Conducting Award 2009
- United Nations Voice of the Artist Award 2008
- James and Lola Faust Fellowship 2007
- National Symphony/Leonard Slatkin Conducting Institute Search – Finalist 2006
- Yvar Mikhashoff Trust for New Music – Award recipient 2003
- Hazel Scott Memorial Prize for Outstanding Musical Achievement 2003
- Mabel Henderson Memorial Grant for Foreign Experience 2001
- Capitol Region Foundation Grant for Arts in Education 2001
- Rose Hanus Fellowship – Recipient 1998
- North Shore Music Competition – Winner 1987
- NAACP National ACT-SO Competition – Winner 1986
- Key to the City of Chicago – Recipient 1986

== Discography ==
- Maurice Ravel: Piano Concertos (2010), with Melville Brown (piano) and the Sofia Sinfonietta, conducted by Marlon Daniel.
- Hampson Sisler: Phoenix Forever – Orchestral Music (2011), performed by the Praga Sinfonietta, conducted by Marlon Daniel. MSR Classics, MS1389.
- Hampson Sisler: The Second Coming (2013), performed by the Sofia Sinfonietta and Sofia Chamber Choir, conducted by Marlon Daniel. MSR Classics, MS1489.
- Hristo Popov: Haydn & Bologne Violin Concertos (2023), featuring violinist Hristo Popov, and the Havana Lyceum Orchestra, conducted by Marlon Daniel. Top Classical Records.
- Total Tango: Music of Astor Piazzolla (2023), featuring violinist Eric Silberger, guitarist Mircea Gogoncea, and the Havana Lyceum Orchestra, conducted by Marlon Daniel. Hathor Classics.
- Gilbert-Michel Rolle: Chants des Equinoxes (2025), featuring Gilbert-Michel Rolle, and the Havana Lyceum Orchestra, conducted by Marlon Daniel.
