= Eurovision Young Musicians 1990 =

International youth classical music contest

Dates and venue
- Semi-final 1: 24 May 1990
- Semi-final 2: 25 May 1990
- Final: 29 May 1990
- Venue: Musikverein; Vienna, Austria

Organisation
- Organiser: European Broadcasting Union (EBU)
- Executive supervisor: Frank Naef

Production
- Host broadcaster: Österreichischer Rundfunk (ORF)
- Director: Claus Viller
- Executive producer: Heidelinde Rudy
- Musical director: Pinchas Steinberg
- Presenter: Gerhard Toetschinger

Participants
- Number of entries: 18
- Number of finalists: 5
- Debuting countries: Greece; Portugal
- Participation map: Finalist countries Countries eliminated in the preliminary round Countries that participated in the past but not in 1990

Vote
- Voting system: Jury chose their top 3 favourites by vote.
- Winning musician: Netherlands; Niek van Oosterum

Eurovision Young Musicians 1990 was the 5th edition of Eurovision Young Musicians. It consisted of two semi-finals on 24 and 25 May and a final on 29 May 1990, held at Musikverein in Vienna, Austria, and presented by Gerhard Toetschinger. It was organised by the European Broadcasting Union (EBU) and host broadcaster Österreichischer Rundfunk (ORF). The Austrian Radio Symphony Orchestra conducted by Pinchas Steinberg accompanied all competing performers.

Musicians representing eighteen countries took part in the competition, with five of them participating in the televised final. Greece and Portugal made their début at this contest.

The winner was pianist Niek van Oosterum representing the Netherlands, with violinist Koh Gabriel Kameda representing Germany placing second, and accordionist Christophe Delporte representing Belgium placing third.

== Location ==
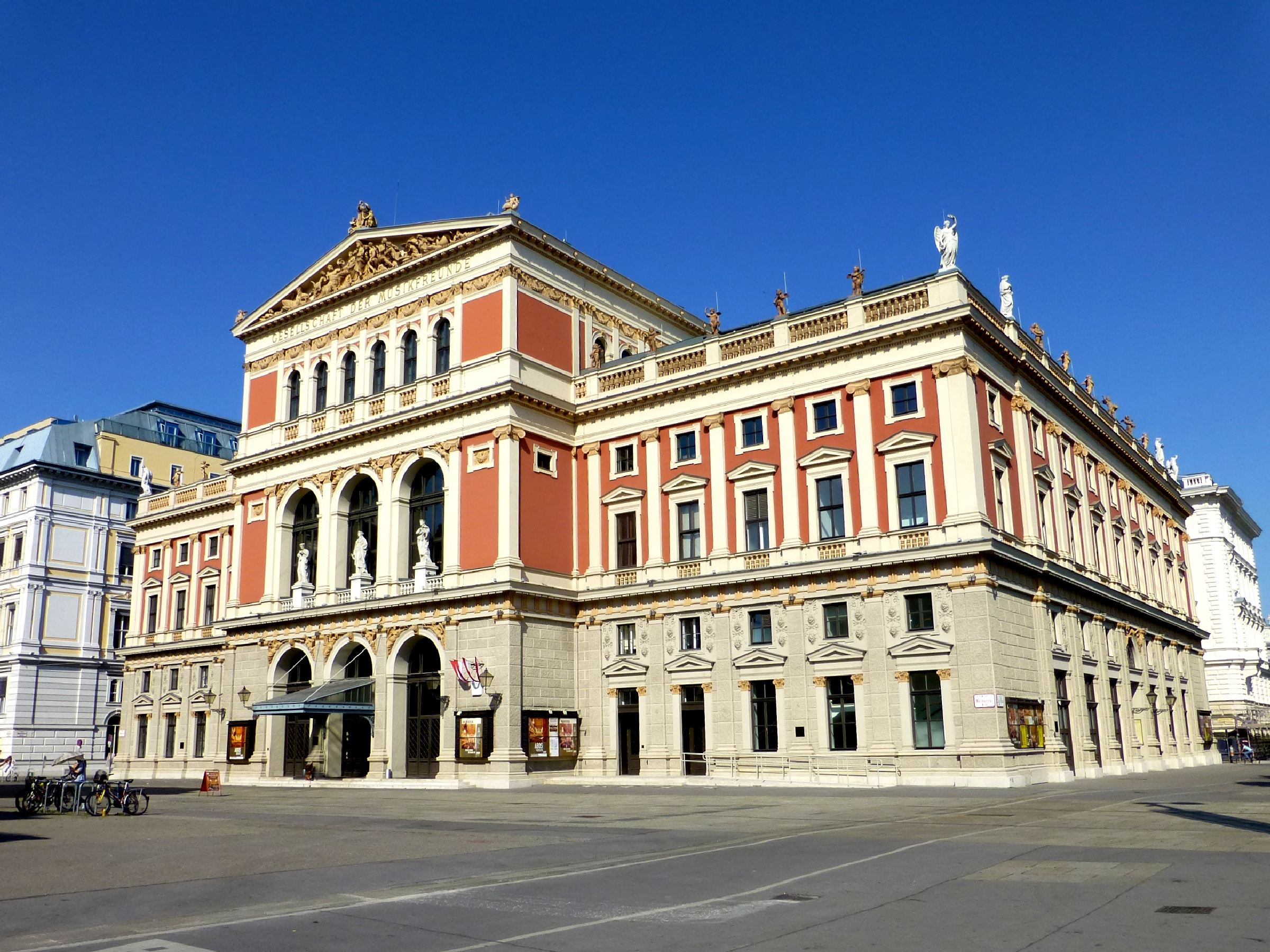
Musikverein, Austria. Venue of Eurovision Young Musicians 1990.

The Musikverein (also known as the "Wiener Musikverein") a concert hall in Vienna, Austria, was the host venue for the 1990 edition of Eurovision Young Musicians. It is the home to the Vienna Philharmonic orchestra.

The "Great Hall" (Großer Saal) due to its highly regarded acoustics is considered one of the finest concert halls in the world, along with Berlin's Konzerthaus, the Concertgebouw in Amsterdam, and Boston's Symphony Hall. None of these halls was built in the modern era with the application of acoustics science and all share a long, tall, and narrow shoebox shape.

The Großer Musikvereinssaal, or Goldener Saal (Golden Hall), is about 49 m (161 ft) long, 19 m (62 ft) wide, and 18 m (59 ft) high. It has 1,744 seats and standing room for 300. The Skandalkonzert of 1913 was given there, and it is the venue for the annual Vienna New Year's Concert.

== Format ==
Gerhard Toetschinger was the host of the 1990 contest. 1988 winner Julian Rachlin performed as the interval act.

== Participants and results ==
=== Preliminary round ===
Broadcasters from eighteen countries took part in the preliminary round of the 1990 contest, of which five qualified to the televised grand final. The following participants failed to qualify.

Country	Broadcaster	Performer	Instrument	Piece	Composer
Cyprus	CyBC	Constantinos Stylianou	Piano	Piano Concerto No. 1 in E flat major	Franz Liszt
Denmark	DR	Mikkel Futtrup	Violin	Violin Concerto No. 2 in D minor, Op. 22	Henryk Wieniawski
Finland	Yle	Sharon Jaari	Violin	Violin Concerto No. 2 in D minor, Op. 44	Max Bruch
Greece	ERT	Jánnisz Tszitszelíkisz	Cello	Variations on a Rococo Theme, Op. 33	Pyotr Ilyich Tchaikovsky
Ireland	RTÉ	Patricia Moynihan	Flute	Flute Concerto No. 1 in G major, K. 313	Wolfgang Amadeus Mozart
Italy	RAI	Vittorio Ceccanti	Cello	Cello Concerto in D minor	Édouard Lalo
Norway	NRK	Gudrun Skretting	Piano	Symphonic Variations	César Franck
Portugal	RTP	António Miguel Camolas Quitalo	Trumpet	Trumpet Concerto in E flat major	Joseph Haydn
Spain	TVE	Fernado Alvarez Goicoechea	Accordion	Suite Iberoamericana	Francisco Cano
Sweden	SVT	Fredrik Fors	Clarinet	Clarinet Concerto	Jean Françaix
Switzerland	SRG SSR	Rafael Rosenfeld	Cello	Cello Concerto No. 1 in A minor, Op. 33	Camille Saint-Saëns
United Kingdom	BBC	Nicola Loud	Violin	Violin Concerto No. 1 in G minor, Op. 26	Max Bruch
Yugoslavia	JRT	Dejan Božić	Cello	Cello Concerto in B minor, Op. 104	Antonín Dvořák

=== Final ===
Niek van Oosterum from the Netherlands won the contest. The placing results of the remaining participants is unknown and never made public by the European Broadcasting Union.

Participants and results
R/O	Country	Broadcaster	Performer(s)	Instrument	Piece(s)	Composer(s)	Pl.
1	Netherlands	NOS	Niek van Oosterum	Piano	Piano Concerto, Op. 16, 1st mov.	Edvard Grieg	1
2	Austria	ORF	Christine Heeger	Piano	Piano Concerto No. 2 in A-major	Franz Liszt	
3	Belgium	RTBF	Christophe Delporte	Accordion	Accordion concerto in B-Major, 2nd and 1st mov.	Nikolai Chaikin	3
4	West Germany	ZDF	Koh Gabriel Kameda	Violin	Violin Concerto in D-Major, Op. 77, 1st mov.	Johannes Brahms	2
5	France	FR3	Anne Gastinel	Cello	Cello Concerto in B-Minor, Op. 104, 1st mov.	Antonin Dvorak	

== Jury members ==
The jury members consisted of the following:

- Austria/United States – Carole Dawn Reinhart
- Austria – Rainer Küchl
- Czechoslovakia – Václav Neumann (head)
- France – Philippe Entremont
- Germany – Günther Breest
- United Kingdom – Brian J. Pollard
- United Kingdom – Charles Medlam

== Broadcasts ==
EBU members from the following countries broadcast the final round. It was reportedly broadcast in 23 channels of the participating countries, and in Bulgaria, Romania and the Soviet Union via Intervision. Known details on the broadcasts in each country, including the specific broadcasting stations and commentators are shown in the tables below.

Broadcasters in participating countries
Country	Broadcaster	Channel(s)	Commentator(s)	Ref(s)
Austria	ORF	FS2		
Belgium	RTBF	Télé 21		
Cyprus	CyBC	RIK		
Denmark	DR	DR TV	Peter Borgwardt	
Finland	YLE	TV1		
France	FR3 (Note: Delayed broadcast on 30 May 1990 at 20:53 (CET))		Alain Duault	
Germany	3sat			
Greece	ERT			
Ireland	RTÉ			
Italy	RAI	Rai Tre		
Netherlands	NOS	Nederland 3	Annemiek Tan	
Norway	NRK	NRK Fjernsynet	Eyvind Solås	
Portugal	RTP			
Spain	TVE			
Sweden	SVT	TV2	Marianne Söderberg	
Switzerland	SRG SSR			
Switzerland	SRG SSR	SRG Sportkette, DRS 2		
Switzerland	SRG SSR	SSR Chaîne Sportive, Espace 2		
Switzerland	SRG SSR	TSI Canale Sportivo		
United Kingdom	BBC	BBC2	Humphrey Burton and Edward Gregson	
Yugoslavia	JRT	TV Beograd 2		
Yugoslavia	JRT	TV Ljubljana 2		
Yugoslavia	JRT	TV Novi Sad		
Yugoslavia	JRT	TV Zagreb 2		

Broadcasters in non-participating countries
Country	Broadcaster	Channel(s)	Commentator(s)	Ref(s)
Bulgaria	BNT			
Romania	TVR	TVR 1 (Note: Delayed broadcast on 4 September 1990 at 22:00 (EEST).)		
Soviet Union	CT USSR			

== See also ==
- Eurovision Song Contest 1990
