= Robert Phillips (guitarist) =

American classical guitarist (born 1953)

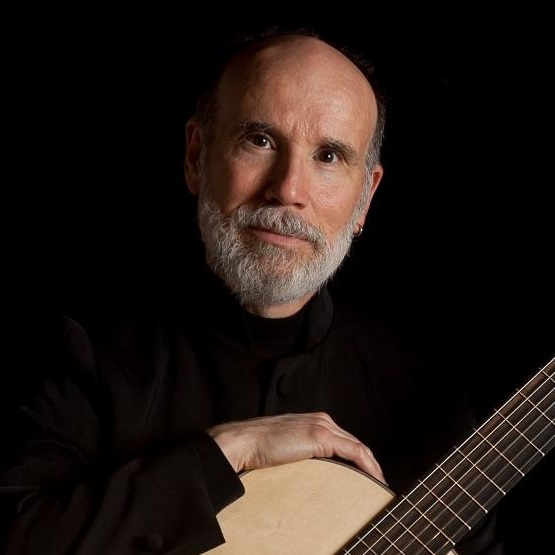
- Portrait of Phillips, 2017

Background information
- Born: Robert Michael Phillips; July 26, 1953 (age 73); New York City, New York, U.S.
- Genres: Classical
- Occupations: Guitarist, guitar instructor
- Instrument: Guitar
- Labels: TPL, Mel Bay, Centaur, 4Tay
- Website: www.robert-phillips.com.com

Robert Phillips (born July 26, 1953, New York City) is an American classical guitarist.

== Early life ==
Born Robert Michael Phillips, he is the son of Dr. Robert Warren Phillips and Dr. Irma Phillips who lived, although only briefly, in Valley Stream, New York. A few months after his birth his parents returned to his mother's native Puerto Rico, living in San Juan. Three years later they returned to the U.S., living for two years in Brooklyn, New York and then moving to Deer Park, New York. He attended Sts. Cyril and Methodius Catholic school and then Seton Hall High School.

== Music career ==
=== Education ===
Phillips began his musical training at age 8 on the accordion. He began to teach himself the guitar at age 12. He did not work with a teacher until 1967, when he began to learn finger-style folk guitar. After taking lessons for a year, he studied classical guitar at the suggestion of his teacher.

In 1971, he entered Hofstra University as a Music Education major, studying under Stanley Solow. After graduating in 1975, Phillips began studies in New York under José Rey de la Torre. In 1976, Rey left New York for San Francisco, and Phillips worked on his own for the next two years. In 1977, after attending a three-week seminar and master class under the direction of Guido Santórsola and Carlos Barbosa-Lima, Phillips began to study on a more or less regular basis with Barbosa-Lima. In 1979, Phillips decided that a more regular regimen of study was desirable, and he studied briefly with Dennis Koster. Soon after, he returned to school at Brooklyn College in order to earn a master's degree. He studied first with David Starobin and then with Michael Cedric Smith. Phillips graduated with an master's degree 1982. Although he did play in master classes, most notably by Eduardo Fernandez, Phillips did not return to formal education until 1999, when he entered the University of Miami. Under the instruction of Rene Gonzalez, he earned a Doctor of Musical Arts. While at the University of Miami, he also had the opportunity to perform in a master class given by Sergio Assad.

=== Performing and recording ===
He made his New York recital debut at Weill Recital Hall at Carnegie Hall on October 31, 1987. In 1991 he released his first album, Guitarre Nouveau, which included works by Philip Glass, Frank Martin, Eberhard Weber, and Thelonious Monk, as well as his own compositions. In 1996 he released a two-CD set, Great Themes and Variations for Classic Guitar as a companion to his anthology of the same name. His next recording wasn't until 2014 when he released the complete solo guitar works of Miguel Llobet in a recording titled, Lo Mestre, the Music of Miguel Llobet.

He performs as a solo recitalist, ensemble player, and guest soloist. He has premiered works by Alfred Giusto, Frank Brazinski, and Eric Ross, as well as the "Pipedream Sonata" by Meyer Kupferman, which Phillips commissioned, and the Goyescana Concerto for guitar and orchestra by Michael Colina, which he also commissioned and premiered in 2008.

In 2016 Phillips embarked on a commissioning project, enlisting six Central Florida based composers to each create a new work for solo guitar in a dance rhythm. The composers who participated in the project were Troy Gifford, Jorge Morel, Benoit Glazer, Charles Griffin, all from Orlando; Howard J. Buss, from Lakeland, Florida; and Rex Willis, from Sarasota.

In late 2022 Phillips began preparations for a new commissioning project. With this project he intended to ask several immigrant composers to write new works for solo guitar in dance rhythms that would reflect their respective native cultures. He called the project “Dances of the Diaspora.” In January 2023, Phillips launched a public, grassroots funding campaign on Fractured Atlas, a 501(c)(3) non profit fiscal sponsor, securing funding from the Puffin Foundation as well as several private donors to pay the composers for their commissions. The composers and their respective countries of origin were Fernando Otero from Argentina, Naama Perel-Tzadok from Israel, Donia Jarrar, a Palestinian of Kuwaiti birth, Fred Onovwerosuoke from Ghana, and Olga Amelkina-Vera from Belarus. Ms. Perel-Tzadok and Ms. Jarrar were delayed in delivering their completed compositions due to the October 7 attacks and subsequent Gaza war, which directly impacted both their families. By November, 2024 however, all compositions were delivered. The Dances of the Diaspora was first performed publicly on March 30, 2025 at The Well in Lakeland, Florida. They were recorded on September 18, 19, and 20, 2025 along with several original compositions by Phillips, and released in March 2026 on 4Tay records.

=== Writing ===
In 1983 Phillips worked briefly as an editorial assistant on the staff of Guitar Review. In 1989 he began writing a monthly classical guitar column in the rock-oriented guitar magazine, Guitar for the Practicing Musician, and its more general sister publication, the quarterly, Guitar Extra.

In 1992 Cherry Lane Music discontinued the publication of Guitar Extra, and dropped his classical guitar column in Guitar for the Practicing Musician. Phillips went on to write several short "lessons" for Guitar Player magazine. He also contributed articles to Soundboard, the quarterly publication of the Guitar Foundation of America, and to American String Teacher, the journal of the American String Teachers Association. In 1996, he published Great Themes and Variations for Classic Guitar (Mel Bay), and released his second recording, a companion to the book.

His doctoral dissertation is titled, The Influence of Miguel Llobet on the Pedagogy, Repertoire, and Stature of the Guitar in the Twentieth Century( 2002, OCLC 51796355). It was while researching his dissertation, and on the advice of guitar scholars Ron Purcell and Angelo Gilardino that Phillips sought and found a complete archive of Llobet. His discovery of this missing archive was documented in his article, "Barcelona, Cradle of the Modern Classical Guitar: the Llobet Archive Rediscovered", Soundboard XXVIII, no. 4, 2002.

=== Teaching ===
Phillips began teaching guitar, music appreciation, and music theory at All Saints' Academy in 1995, and went on to become the chair of the performing arts department until 2008. In 2008, while continuing his duties as an instructor at All Saints' Academy, he began teaching guitar at Polk State College and Southeastern University. In 2010 he left All Saints' Academy, and accepted a position teaching classical guitar at Lois Cowles Harrison Center for the Visual and Performing Arts. In June 2023 Phillips retired from teaching and focused his attention on performing, recording, composing and commissioning new music.

== Video ==
In 1983 Phillips appeared in a series of instructional videos titled "Classical Guitar Made Easy" which was broadcast on Group W Cable. Following the series, he began to produce and host a monthly talk show on Group W. The talk show, Long Island Sounds, featured interviews and performances of Long Island-based musicians. The show ran for three years, after which Phillips changed the trajectory of his efforts, not returning to video for nearly three decades.

In 2011, taking advantage of new technology and relatively inexpensive production costs, Robert produced and recorded a series of videos of himself performing standards from the classical guitar repertory. Many of these performances were recorded in interesting locations, with the settings of some being almost as much of a feature as the music. Locations included the Museum of Fine Arts (St. Petersburg, Florida), and the Frank Lloyd Wright Danforth Chapel at the Florida Southern College Child of the Sun. These videos were to be bundled together as "video albums", consisting of compositions that were thematically related. The first of these, "A Spanish Recital", consisted of works by Isaac Albéniz, Enrique Granados, Miguel Llobet, Francisco Tárrega, and Federico Moreno Torroba.

In 2015 Phillips began to produce "A Year of the Guitar", a video diary in which he chronicled his daily relationship with the instrument. The entries include performances of pieces, study guides for learning pieces, insights into his own daily practice, and instructional materials. These videos were published on Phillips' YouTube channel with a series of instructional videos.

== Discography ==
- Guitarre Nouveau – works by Philip Glass, Eberhard Weber, Thelonious Monk, Frank Martin, and Robert Phillips (TPL)
- Great Themes and Variations for Classic Guitar – works by Fernando Sor, Mauro Giuliani, Matteo Carcassi, Sylvius Leopold Weiss, Georg Frideric Handel, J. S. Bach, and others (Mel Bay)
- Lo Mestre – complete solo guitar works of Miguel Llobet (Centaur)
- Night/Dances works by Robert Phillips, Jorge Morel, Charles Griffin, Benoit Glazer, Troy Gifford, Rex Willis, Howard Buss and John W. Powell 4Tay Records
- Dances of the Diaspora works by Robert Phillips, Fernando Otero, Naama Perel-Tzadok, Donia Jarrar, Fred Onovwerosuoke, and Olga Amelkina-Vera 4Tay Records

== Sources ==
- Bert, Alison. Review of Guitarre Nouveau by Robert Phillips. Guitar Extra (Summer 1991), p. 93.
- Carrier, Joel. "Robert Phillips Works to Expand Classical Guitar Repertoire." LKLD Now. LKLD Now, Web. 8 Mar. 2021. <https://www.lkldnow.com/robert-phillips-works-to-expand-classical-guitar-repertoire/>.
- Catala, Paul. "Lakeland Composer Commissions Pieces Written for Guitar in Dance Rhythms." The Ledger. The Ledger, 17 Feb. 2017. Web. 17 Nov. 2017. <http://www.theledger.com/news/20170124/catala-lakeland-composer-commissions-pieces-written-for-guitar-in-dance-rhythms>.
- Catala, Paul. "Swan song: Harrison Arts guitar instructor Robert Phillips leading his last spring concert." The Ledger. The Ledger, 10 Ap. 2023. Web. 10 Ap. 2023 <https://www.theledger.com/story/news/local/2023/04/10/renowned-guitar-instructor-robert-phillips-retiring-from-harrison-arts/70090153007/>.
- Crutchfield, Will. "Robert Phillips, Guitar." The New York Times. The New York Times, 02 Nov. 1987. Web. 17 Nov. 2017. <https://www.nytimes.com/1987/11/03/arts/music-noted-in-brief-robert-phillips-guitar.html>.
- Fabian, Valentine. "Meyer Kupferman, Composer." Jeffrey James Arts Consulting Composer Notes, <http://www.jamesarts.com/MKBIO2000.htm>.
- Gherman, Sergiu . “Guitar Concerto High Point of Performance.” The Ledger, The Ledger, 12 Nov. 2008, <http://www.theledger.com/news/20081112/guitar-concerto-high-point-of-performance>.
- Griffin, Charlie. "Guitarist Robert Phillips and the Orange Blossom Dances." Artborne Magazine 2, no.6 June 2017, p. 53-54. Web. 27 June 2017. <https://artbornemagazine.com/guitarist-robert-phillips-and-the-orange-blossom-dances/>.
- McMullen, Cary. “Imperial Symphony Orchestra Has Innovative Season.” The Ledger, The Ledger, 1 May 2009, <http://www.theledger.com/news/20090501/imperial-symphony-orchestra-has-innovative-season>.
- Phillips, Robert: "Barcelona, Cradle of the Modern Classical Guitar: The Llobet Archive Rediscovered", Soundboard 28, no. 4 (Spring 2002), p. 39-41.
- Reinstetlethe, Matt . "Harrison Teacher Releases Third Classical-Music Album." The Ledger. The Ledger, 27 Feb. 2014. Web. 17 Nov. 2017. <http://www.theledger.com/news/20140227/harrison-teacher-releases-third-classical-music-album>.
- Official web site
