= Seton Hall High School =

Location
- 155 West Roe Blvd; Patchogue, (Suffolk County), New York 11772-2325; United States; 40°46′35″N 73°1′29″W

Information
- Type: Private, Coeducational
- Motto: Esse quam videri (To be rather than to seem)
- Religious affiliation: Roman Catholic
- Patron saint: Mother Elizabeth Ann Seton
- Established: 1937
- Status: closed
- Closed: 1974
- School district: Private
- Grades: 9-12
- Campus size: 27 acres
- Colors: Blue and White
- Sports: baseball, basketball, football, cross country, track, field hockey, softball, cheerleading, tennis,
- Mascot: Eagle
- Team name: Eagles
- Newspaper: Seton Hall Days and Chimera
- Yearbook: Milestones
- Website: http://www.setonhallhs.org

Seton Hall High School was located on 155 West Roe Boulevard in Patchogue, New York. Prior to 1952, the school was situated in bungalows on South Ocean Avenue. It opened in September 1937 and was closed in June 1974. Seton Hall was one of very few co-educational Catholic High Schools on Long Island, New York. The team mascot was the Eagle. The school motto was "Esse quam videri" meaning "To be, rather than to seem (to be)" and it appeared on the class rings of the school.

The former campus is now home to St. Joseph's University.

== Religious identity ==
Seton Hall was a Co-Ed Roman Catholic private school operated by the Sisters of Charity of Halifax.

== History ==
September 1937 - first freshman class begins
June 1941 - first senior class graduates
September 1952 - Seton Hall moves to permanent campus at 155 West Roe Boulevard, Patchogue, NY
June 1974 - last senior class graduates

== Notable faculty and staff ==
Frank Layden coached varsity basketball 1962 to 1966. Went on to coach Niagara University and the Utah Jazz

Henry Read, athletic director and football coach, held the record for most high school football victories in the history of Suffolk County, NY. (That record has since been surpassed).

== Notable alumni ==
Mary Louise Brink, S.C., Ph.D.; Seton Hall's last principal and eventually the elected leader of the Sisters of Charity; the first woman appointed Academic Dean at the Immaculate Conception Seminary, New York

Robert Davi, actor, director, political activist
Billy Hayes student in the early 1960s. Author of the book, Midnight Express, which was later adapted into the 1978 film Midnight Express
Bob McCarthy, class of 1966, musician
Robert Phillips (guitarist) class of 1971
John Schmitt, professional football (US), played center for the New York Jets. He played in Super Bowl III

Very Rev. John Felice, OFM; 1959; Former Pastor of St. Francis of Assisi Church, NYC; Co-founder of Saint Francis Residences and Saint Francis Friends of the Poor, NYC; Former Provincial Minister of Franciscan Friars, Holy Name Province, NYC.
