= Gerhard Tötschinger =

Austrian actor, director, and writer

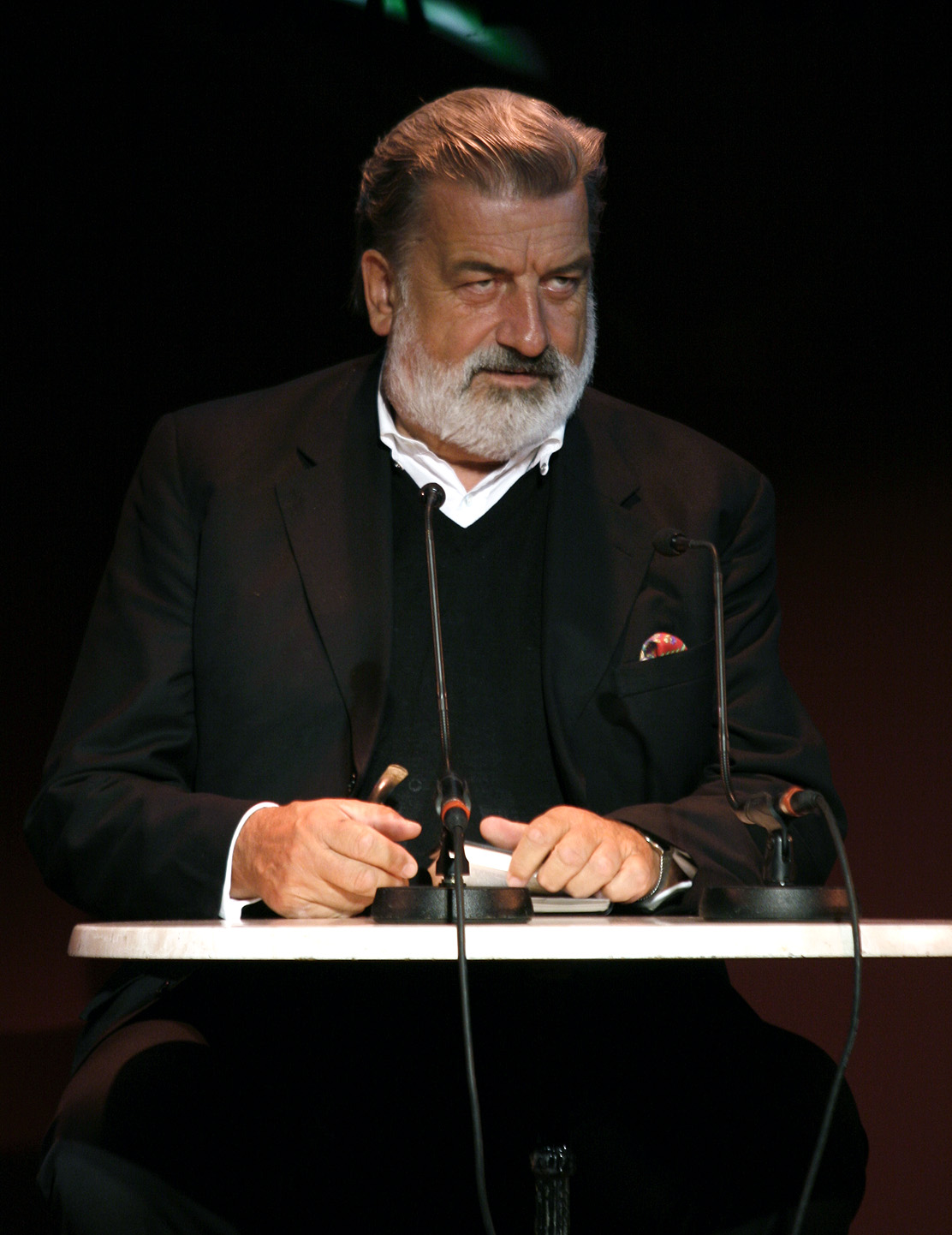
- Gerhard Tötschinger in 2008
- Born: 26 June 1946; Vienna, Austria
- Died: 10 August 2016 (aged 70); St. Gilgen, Austria
- Occupations: Actor; director; writer
- Years active: 1966–2016

Gerhard Tötschinger (26 June 1946 – 10 August 2016) was an Austrian actor, director, and writer.

Tötschinger grew up in Vienna and studied theater and art history after gymnasium. He began his theatrical career in the 1960s, appearing in plays in Austria, Germany, and Switzerland. In the 1970s, the actor first appeared as a director. He organized the "Fest in Hellbrunn" in Salzburg, the Festival "Arteuropa" in Todi and the Sommerspiele Perchtoldsdorf. Tötschinger wrote numerous books on the history of Austria, the Habsburgs and Franz Liszt. He ran for the Landtag in 2010 on the ÖVP ticket. In 2012 he received the Buchpreis der Wiener Wirtschaft. In 2015 he received the Goldenes Verdienstzeichen des Landes Wien.

He suffered a serious fall in 2009 and had his left foot amputated. He died of a pulmonary embolism on 10 August 2016. He was vacationing in St. Gilgen with his partner, Christiane Hörbiger, whom he planned to soon marry.
