= Magali Léger =

French opera singer

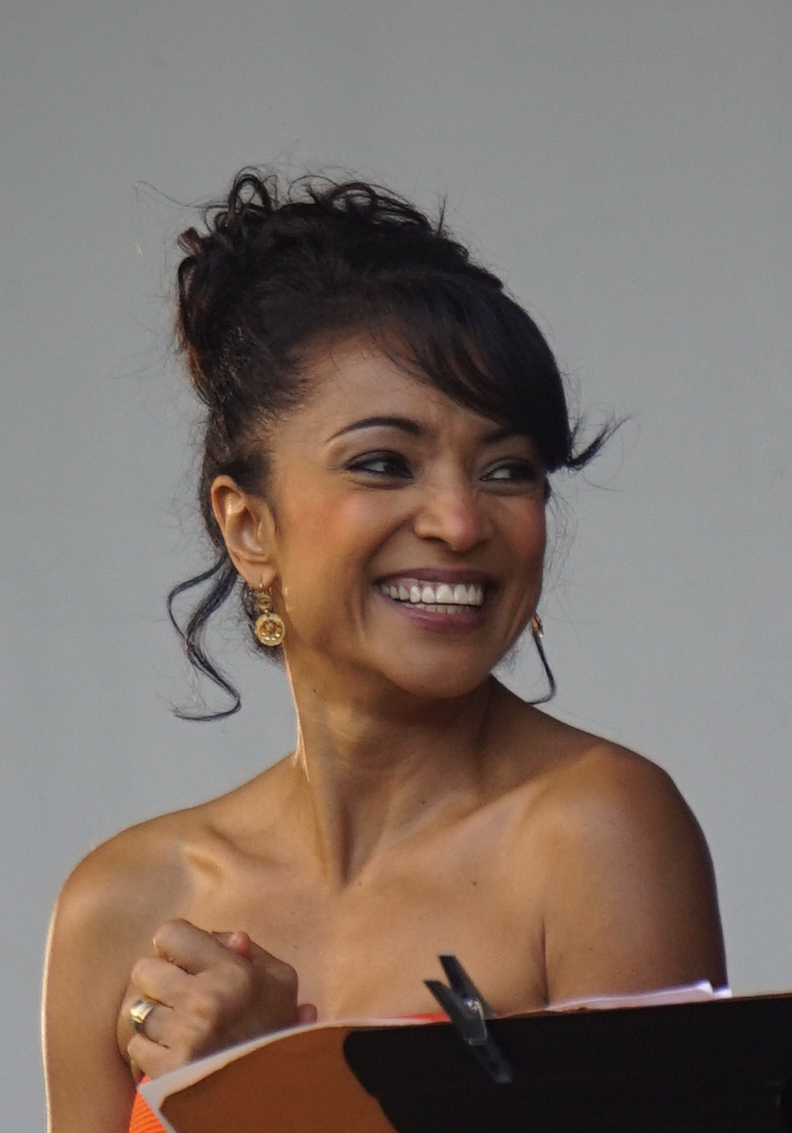
- At the Flâneries musicales de Reims in 2016
- Born: 1976 (age 49–50); Paris, France
- Citizenship: French
- Education: Conservatoire de Paris
- Occupation: Opera singer (soprano)
- Years active: 1999–present
- Spouse: married
- Children: 2
- Website: www.magalileger.fr

Magali Léger is a contemporary French light soprano.

== Biography ==
Originally from Guadeloupe, Léger was a student of Christiane Eda-Pierre. In 1999, she won a First prize at the Conservatoire de Paris.

In 2003 she was nominated in the "Révélations" category of the Victoires de la musique.

== Discography ==
- Mottetti e Sonata da chiesa (motets and church sonatas), Georg Friedrich Haendel, Magali Léger and the RosaSolis ensemble, Musica Ficta, 2009.
- La Bonne Chanson, Gabriel Fauré, Magali Léger/Michaël Levinas, M&A 2008.
- Médée, opera by Michèle Reverdy, Mandala 2004.
- Pergolesi & Porpora, Cantate e Sonata da camera (Pergolesi and Porpora, cantatas and chamber sonatas), Magali Léger and RosaSolis.
- Astor Piazzola, Magali Léger and pianist Marcela Roggeri, Transart Live.
- La Métamorphose, opera by Michael Levinas, Aeon, 2012.
- Debussy : complete mélodies, Ligia Digital, décembre 2014.

== Videography ==
- Die Entführung aus dem Serail by Mozart, Les Musiciens du Louvre, conducted by Marc Minkowski, direction Jérôme Deschamps and Macha Makeïeff, Festival d'Aix-en-Provence 2004, BelAir Classic.
- "Rameau, Maître à Danser" - Daphnis et Eglé - La naissance d'Osiris, Les Arts Florissants, conducted by William Christie, Outhere Music, 2014.
