= Koh Gabriel Kameda =

Japanese violinist (born 1975)

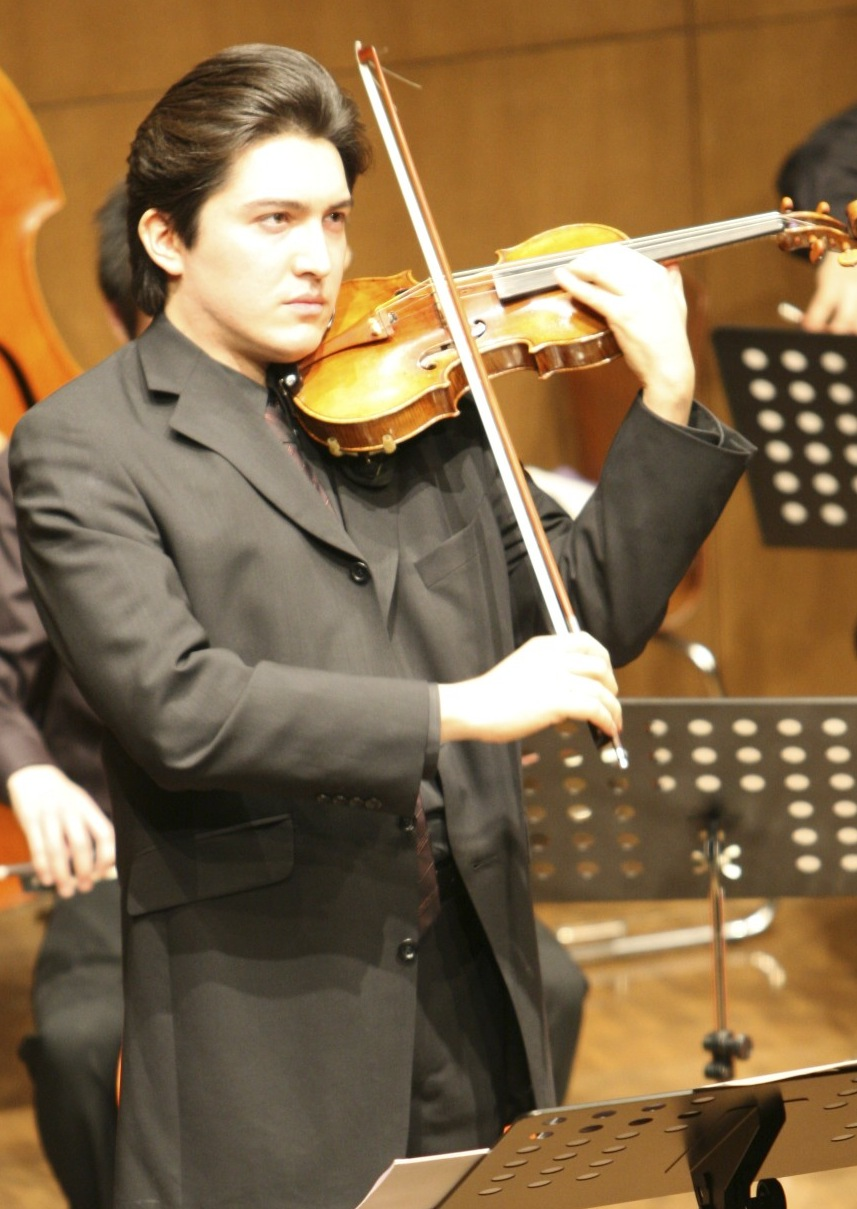
- Koh Gabriel Kameda at a concert in Tokyo

Background information
- Born: Koh Gabriel Kameda; January 14, 1975 (age 51); Freiburg, Germany
- Origin: Germany
- Genre: Classical
- Occupations: Pedagogue, violinist
- Instrument: Violin
- Years active: 1988 - present

Koh Gabriel Kameda (Japanese: 亀田 光; born January 14, 1975) is a German and Japanese concert violinist and violin teacher.

== Early life ==
Koh Gabriel Kameda was born in Freiburg im Breisgau, Germany, the son of a German woman, Margarita and a Japanese father. He began playing the violin at the age of five and started participating in competitions from the age of eight, winning mostly first prizes. Shortly after that, he was taken under the wing of Josef Rissin in Karlsruhe.

== Career ==
Kameda, who was the first prize winner of the Henryk Szeryng International Violin Competition in Mexico in 1997, enjoyed great recognition by both international audiences and colleagues. After hearing him play, Yehudi Menuhin stated enthusiastically that he “was extremely impressed” with Kameda's performance and Sir James Galway proclaimed that “he is one of the most remarkable players of his generation”.

At the age of twelve, Kameda enrolled in the University of Music in Karlsruhe, Germany, and was mentored by professor Josef Rissin. In 1993 violinist and conductor Pinchas Zukerman invited him to come to New York and work with him at the Manhattan School of Music.

Kameda received numerous prizes from national and international competitions. He won first prize at the National German Competition for young musicians, first prize at the International Violin Competition Kloster Schöntal, and first prize at the International Violin Competition “Henryk Szeryng”. In addition to that, he was also a prizewinner at the Eurovision Contest in Vienna, which was broadcast live on TV throughout Europe.

During his career Kameda has received various awards, including the Music Award of the European Industry, the Jürgen-Ponto Foundation award, the Deutsche Stiftung Musikleben award, the Baden-Württemberg Art Foundation award, a scholarship from the international Richard Wagner Society, the Dora Zaslavsky-Koch Scholarship Award and others.

Kameda debuted in 1988 at the age of thirteen in Baden-Baden, Germany, performing the Violin Concerto no.5 by Henri Vieuxtemps with the Baden-Baden Philharmonic Orchestra. Since then he has performed all throughout Europe, Asia, as well as in North and South America. He has appeared as a soloist with leading orchestras around the world including the Staatskapelle Dresden, Berliner Symphoniker, Hamburger Symphoniker, Israel Philharmonic Orchestra, Japan Philharmonic Orchestra, Athens State Orchestra, and Mexico City Philharmonic Orchestra among many others.

An outstanding moment in Kameda's early career was the collaboration with the late Witold Lutoslawski in 1993, in a series of concerts, a year before the death of the Polish composer. He performed “Chain II” under the baton of the composer himself, and from those concerts the last live CD of the composer was produced, receiving acclaim by the press: “outstanding”, according to Neue Musik Zeitung; “superb technique and expressive maturity”, wrote Frankfurter Allgemeine Zeitung.

=== Time in Japan ===
Kameda has received praise for his extensive artistic activities in Japan, where he has become a figure in the classical music scene. In 2000 he performed at the Suntory Hall five times, and each time the tickets were sold out completely. Ten years earlier in 1990, he made his stage debut in Japan performing various violin concertos during the same concert in Tokyo (Suntory Hall) and Osaka (The Symphony Hall). However, his career in Japan did not commence with these concerts, but rather on the primetime TV documentary program “NHK special: Einstein Roman” by the Japan Broadcasting Corporation NHK. He worked together with author Michael Ende and fashion designer Hanae Mori, starring in the lead role and recording the soundtrack. At the same time he recorded a LaserDisc of the program, the first classical music LaserDisc produced in Japan.

His ongoing project, “Music Heals”, a series of concerts in hospitals where for many years Kameda has been actively volunteering to bring music to patients, was featured by TV Tokyo in a 60-minute television documentary broadcast in 1999.

In April 2002, Kameda performed at the Violin Concerto by Louis Gruenberg in Japan, with the New Japan Philharmonic under the direction of Gerard Schwarz. This work was commissioned by Jascha Heifetz in 1945. After Jascha Heifetz had performed and recorded the concerto with the San Francisco Symphony Orchestra under Pierre Monteux it has not been presented by anyone until Kameda played it as the first violinist besides Heifetz. Gruenberg's daughter, Joan commented on Kameda's performance “I was delighted to discover your brilliant performance of my father's violin concerto. You have perfected this difficult piece and played it beautifully.” German journalist and author Harald Eggebrecht also reviewed Kameda's performance of the Gruenberg concerto in his book "Große Geiger. Kreisler, Heifetz, Oistrach, Mutter, Hahn und Co".

=== Reviews ===
Kameda is often rated very highly by international reviewers, for example, the Scala Magazine, Ongaku no Tomo, alongside others. Reviewers often mention that he is a "genius violinist," etc.

=== Teaching ===
Kameda held a teaching position at the Zurich University of the Arts between 2004 and 2009. In 2010 he was appointed at his present position as professor of violin at the University of Music Detmold.

== Instrument ==
Kameda has played on notable instruments such as David Tecchler 1715, Antonius Stradivari 1715 ex Joachim, most recently he plays the "Holroyd" Antonius Stradivari of 1727.

== Ensemble ==
In 2006, Kameda founded The Tokyo Chamber Philharmonic. A project orchestra based in the metropolitan area of Tokyo. In the same year, Kameda lead the orchestra on its first tour of Japan, conducting, as well as soloing with the newly founded orchestra; the first program was "The 8 seasons" a combined performance of the Four Seasons by Antonio Vivaldi and the Estaciones Porteñas from Astor Piazzolla arranged by pianist and composer Peter von Wienhardt.

Kameda was also the founding member of the piano trio Trio Frankfurt with pianist Nami Ejiri and cellist Isang Enders.

== Partial list of Concert Halls ==
- Berliner Philharmonie
- Konzerthaus Berlin
- Festspielhaus Baden-Baden
- Alte Oper Frankfurt
- Konzerthaus Dortmund
- Sala São Paulo
- Wigmore Hall, London
- Carnegie Hall, New York
- Suntory Hall, Tokyo
- Symphony Hall, Osaka
- Orchard Hall, Tokyo
- Tokyo Metropolitan Art Space
- Sala Cecilia Mireiles, Rio de Janeiro
- Palacio de Bellas Artes, Mexico City
- Sala Nezahualcóyotl, Mexico City
- Merkin Hall Kaufmann Center, New York City
- 92Y Hall, New York City
- Musikvereinssaal Wien
- Palau de la Musica, Valencia
- Auditoria Nacional, Madrid
- Teatro Teresa Carreño, Caracas
- Sala de Giganti, Padova
- Athens Concert Hall Megaron, Athen
- National Concert Hall Dublin, Ireland

== Partial discography ==
- Romances, kameda-music, King Record
- The World of Koh Gabriel Kameda, BMG Funhouse
- Soundtrack NHK Special: Einstein Roman
- Lutoslawski dirigiert Lutoslawski, Antes Edition

== Filmography ==
- The Extraordinary Life & Music of Sonia Eckhardt-Gramatté
- NHK Special: Einstein Roman
