= Fred Onovwerosuoke =

American composer (born 1960)

Fred "FredO" Onovwerosuoke
- Born: 1960 (age 65–66); Sekondi-Takoradi
- Genres: African music; Choral music; Orchestral music
- Occupation: Composer
- Works: "Bolingo (Ofrenda de amor)"; Twenty-Four Studies in African Rhythms, Volume I; Songs of Africa: 22 Pieces for Mixed Voices
- Awards: ASCAP Award; Brannen-Cooper Fund Award; America Music Center Award; Florence Movie Music Competition
- Education: Principia College
- Known for: Founder of St. Louis African Chorus
- Children: 2
- Website: Official FredO Music Website

Fred Onovwerosuoke (born 1960) is an American composer born in Ghana of Nigerian parents. He is a multiple time winner of the ASCAP Award, among other awards such as the America Music Center Award, Brannen-Cooper Fund Award, and the Minnesota Orchestra Honorable Mention.

== Early life and education ==
Onovwerosuoke was born in Secondi-Takoradi, near the Atlantic Coast in Ghana, West Africa. His early childhood and education through college years were spent in both Ghana and Nigeria. In 1990, he attended Principia College, Elsah, Illinois, on a full scholarship, and while there studied music theory and 20th Century composition techniques under Jim Dowcett, as well as Engineering Science and Computer programming with David Cornell and Tom Fuller. Although Onovwerosuoke has had a wide-ranging training that spans composition, electrical and electronic engineering, information technology, management and musicology, he is known to attribute his interest in music to his childhood as boy-soprano and to his high-school music teacher, Sam Anyanele, who instilled him a deep love of indigenous African music. His tutelage under Dowcett at Principia was said to unleash a creative individualism that eventually evolved into a career as a composer with works that bear influences from Africa, the Caribbean and the American Deep South.

== Career ==
Onovwerosuoke founded the St. Louis African Chorus in 1993 (now Intercultural Music Initiative), with a mission, according to the organization's website, to "foster a better understanding of Africa's cultures through the musical arts." He has been active conducting choral and musical workshops since 1978, but it was his work as composer that earned him much needed acclaim in 2006 when his chant, Bolingo (Ofrenda de amor), in Robert De Niro's movie, The Good Shepherd (Universal Pictures, 2006) became particularly successful and drew attention to other musical works and discography promoted by the African Musical Arts organization.

While the 2005 Hurricane Katrina brought indescribable devastation to many people in New Orleans and the Gulf of Mexico, it was in the aftermath of that disaster that much of Onovwerosuoke's music manuscripts were discovered and salvaged by volunteers who had visited his family to help with the clean-up and rebuilding effort. Shortly afterwards, a quick succession of works were published, including his Twenty-Four Studies in African Rhythms, Volume I (African Music Publishers, 2007), Songs of Africa: 22 Pieces for Mixed Voices (Oxford University Press, 2008), and in the CDs, African Arts Music for Flute by flutist Wendy Hymes and pianist Darryl Hollister, ASA: Piano Music by Composer from Africa and the African Diaspora by pianist William Chapman Nyaho, and the promotional CD, Landscapes of Africa: Music for Orchestra, by the New Horizons Studio Orchestra. Onovwerosuoke has a diverse compositional output that includes orchestra suites and works for various combination of chamber groups.

== Personal life ==
Onovwerosuoke is married to Wendy Hymes and has two sons, Omena Benjamin, born 2001 in St Louis, Missouri and Ghenovo Gabriel, born 2004 in New Orleans, Louisiana.
