= Jean-François Joly de Fleury =

French politician

Director-General of the Royal Treasury
- In office 19 May 1781 – 3 November 1783
- Preceded by: Jacques Necker
- Succeeded by: Henri Lefèvre d'Ormesson
- Monarch: Louis XVI

Personal details
- Born: 7 June 1718 Paris, France
- Died: 12 December 1802 (aged 84) Paris, France
- Spouse: Marie Marguerite Jogues de Villery
- Children: Unknown

Jean-François Joly de Fleury (1718–1802) succeeded Jacques Necker as the Director General of the Royal Treasury for King Louis XVI, serving from 1781 to 1783. He was a member of the influential Joly de Fleury family.

== Family ==
He was the son of Guillaume-François Joly de Fleury, Procurator General of the Parlement of Paris and of Marie Francoise Le Maistre. His brothers were Guillaume-François-Louis Joly de Fleury (1710–1787) who succeeded their father in his post as Procurator General, and Joseph Omer Joly de Fleury who may best be known for his unjust prosecution of Lally Tollendal on charges of treason.

== Finance Minister ==
Joly de Fleury's predecessor was Jacques Necker, the Swiss wunderkind who was brought into the French ministry at a time of great debt in 1777. By the time Necker left in 1781, two things had occurred that exacerbated the crisis growing in the coffers of King Louis XVI of France.

First, Necker had published the Compte rendu au roi, a "full" accounting of the King's finances—which showed that the King's budget was strong given the "ordinary" expenses. What this document failed to show were the "extraordinary" expenses—including massive debts to pay for the American Revolutionary War. This type of publication was previously unheard of in an absolute monarchy and was extremely popular with the people.

The second problem was that Necker had seen the addition of massive debts on behalf of the British colonies to pay for their revolutionary war. These debts were so deep that Necker was having trouble paying the interest on them in addition to all the other expenses for which he had to account.

So when Joly de Fleury took over in 1781, he saw the full and complete version of the books and made several decisions that were unpopular. To correct the problems, he took three steps to stop the financial bleeding:

- he reestablished the practice of selling venal office to raise emergency funds, a procedure that was eliminated in the previous decade to improve the long-term financial stability of the Monarchy
- he worked with his friends and personal connections in multiple French Parlement to push through an emergency tax on the nobility
- he drastically cut the "gifts" the king was giving to his courtiers, which made him unpopular at court

Because his predecessor had published a book that was an incomplete version of the King's finances, Joly de Fleury had a difficult time making his case because members of government would simply point to their copy of the Compte rendu and decry him a liar. Given the unpopularity of his taxes among the wealthy of France and his angering of the King's personal courtiers, eventually Joly de Fleury was forced to resign his position in 1783. He was replaced by Henri Lefèvre d'Ormesson, who served an inconsequential tenure of seven months before being replaced by Charles Alexandre de Calonne.

== Legacy ==
Though a minor figure, Joly de Fleury was one in a series of ministers who acted as a stepping stone toward the French Revolution. His taxes and curtailing of gifts were both rescinded immediately after his departure, but the selling of venal offices continued—trading short-term bandages for long-term solutions to the Monarchy's debt crises.
