= Compte rendu =

Report from Jacques Necker to King Louis XVI of France (1781)

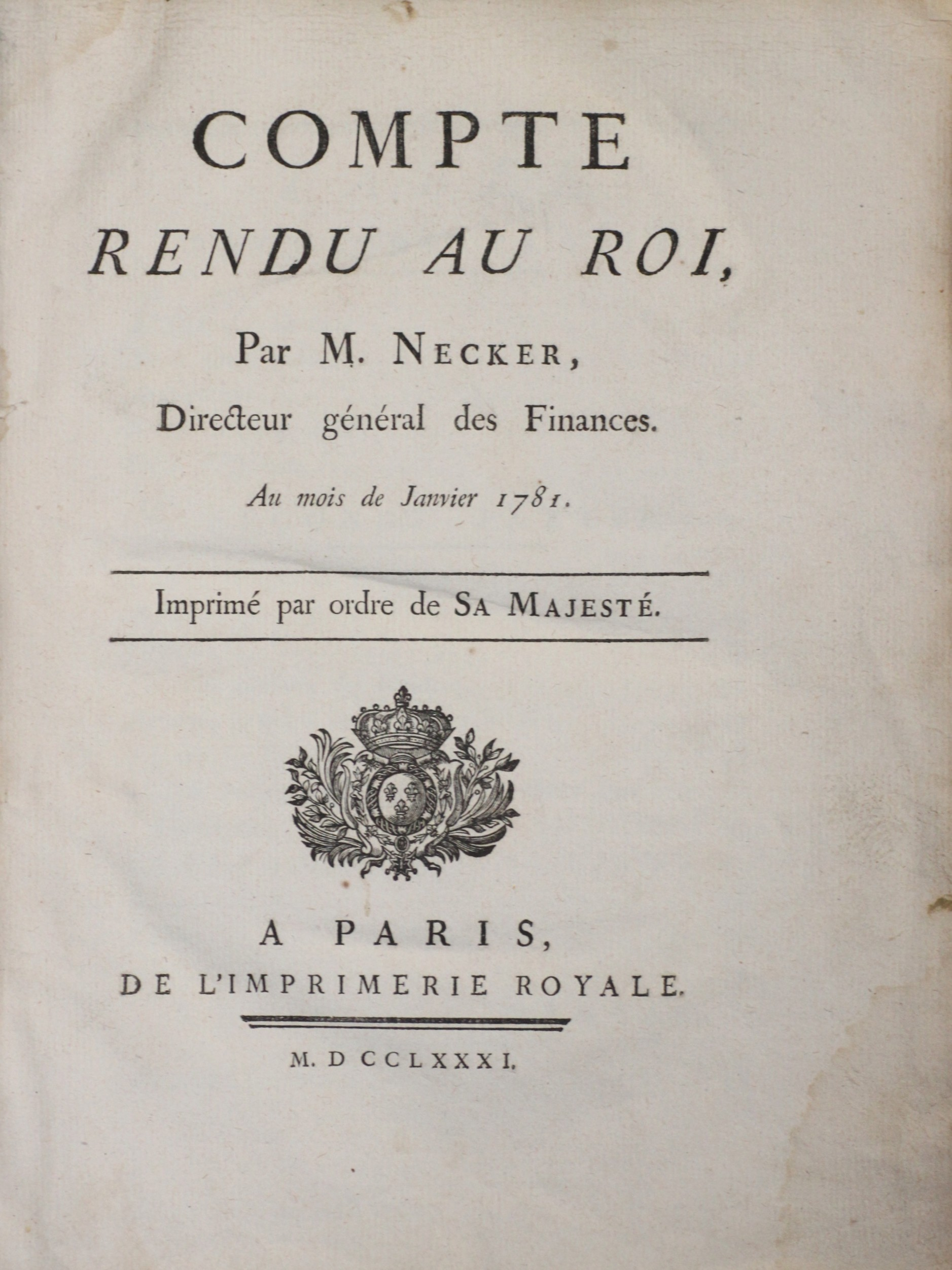
First page of the Compte rendu au Roi

The Compte rendu (full name Compte rendu au Roi, translated as "Report to the King") was a document published in February 1781 by Jacques Necker, finance minister to King Louis XVI, in which he presented the state of France's finances.

== Background ==
The Compte rendu came about in the context of an impending war and in the ascendancy of Jacques Necker as Director-General of Finances (having been unable to take up the traditional title of Controller General, being a Protestant). An outsider, in the words of Simon Schama, public opinion "saw Necker as a banking wizard: someone who could pull rabbits out of hats and money out of thin air." During Necker's time as Director-General, the ministry was dominated by Vergennes, with funding being required for France's ambition to assist the American revolutionaries in their struggle against the British.

== Publication of the report ==
The mere release of the Compte was eventful. Panckoucke and the royal printers in Paris printed an unprecedented 20,000 copies of the Compte, and even then the report had been sold out in weeks and was translated into Dutch, German, Danish, Italian and English. The Napoleonic Marshal Marmont claimed to have been taught to read from the Compte rendu.

The report stated that ordinary revenues in France were exceeding royal expenditures by over 10 million livres, i.e., that the French ministry was running a massive surplus. The health of the accounts as reported in the Compte rendu boosted confidence among lenders. As a consequence, the French government was able to raise new loans to pay for the costs of continued assistance in the American War of Independence on the side of the Americans.

However, Necker's reporting of the accounts obscured the financial problems which the country was facing. Namely, it did not report the "extraordinary" accounts, where the real cost of the war was to be found and which showed France in a significant deficit—between 1777 and 1781, Necker had raised 520 million livres in new loans. Had these been reported, lenders would have been unlikely to continue to lend money for the war.

== Legacy ==
Despite the initial popularity and importance of the Compte rendu, Necker's ascendancy in the ministry did not last. His financial reforms, including attempts to rein in the practice of selling venal offices, had created a large number of enemies intent on causing Necker's downfall. Equally, within the ministry itself, Necker had alienated other key ministers including Vergennes through pursuing his policies. In May 1781, Necker decided to test the King's confidence in him, requesting to be brought into the royal council despite the fact he was a Protestant. When both Vergennes and Jean Frédéric Phélypeaux, Count of Maurepas told Louis they would resign if he acceded to Necker's request, Necker resigned on May 19.

After Necker left his position as Director-General, there was a succession of ministers under whom the true financial situation came to light. The Compte rendu was also arguably a factor in causing resistance to attempts in 1787 by then-finance minister Calonne to reform the financial system. Calonne argued that the state finances were in an emergency and thus required overhaul to ensure greater efficiency in taxation. Calonne characterized the Compte as a fraud, using it as a scapegoat for the poor financial position in which the ministry now found itself, following the reversal of Necker's reforms. The Assembly of Notables, to whom the reforms were initially proposed, were skeptical of this explanation, possibly as a consequence of the belief that France remained in a strong position from the time of Necker.

In the study of the revolution, the Compte rendu has been criticised by modern historians and has been seen as an important link in the chain of events leading ultimately to the crisis that precipitated the events of 1789 and beyond. Equally, it has been argued that the Compte was responsible for popularizing the idea of good financial management as a classical political virtue and enshrining this idea in the Revolution.

== See also ==
- French Revolution
- Jacques Necker
