= Curchod =

Curchod is a surname. Notable people with the surname include:

- Louis Curchod (1826–1889), Swiss engineer and telegraph specialist
- Suzanne Curchod (1737–1794), French-Swiss salonist and writer
