= Jacques Necker =

French statesman (1732–1804)

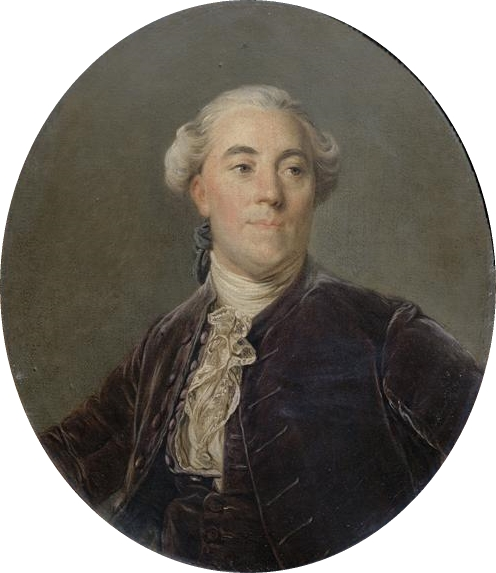
- Portrait by Joseph Duplessis, c. 1781

Chief Minister of the French Monarch
- In office 16 July 1789 – 3 September 1790
- Monarch: Louis XVI
- Preceded by: Baron of Breteuil
- Succeeded by: Count of Montmorin
- In office 25 August 1788 – 11 July 1789
- Monarch: Louis XVI
- Preceded by: Archbishop de Brienne
- Succeeded by: Baron of Breteuil

Controller-General of Finances
- In office 25 August 1788 – 11 July 1789
- Monarch: Louis XVI
- Preceded by: Charles Alexandre de Calonne
- Succeeded by: Joseph Foullon de Doué

Director-General of the Royal Treasury
- In office 29 June 1777 – 19 May 1781
- Monarch: Louis XVI
- Preceded by: Louis Gabriel Taboureau des Réaux
- Succeeded by: Jean-François Joly de Fleury

Personal details
- Born: 30 September 1732 Geneva, Republic of Geneva
- Died: 9 April 1804 (aged 71) Geneva, Léman, France
- Spouse: Suzanne Curchod (m. 1764; died 1794)
- Children: Germaine Necker (Madame de Staël)

Jacques Necker (French: [ʒak nɛkɛʁ]; 30 September 1732 – 9 April 1804) was a Genevan banker, financier and statesman who served as finance minister of France for Louis XVI. He was a reformer, but his innovations sometimes caused great discontent. Necker was a constitutional monarchist, a political economist, and a moralist, who wrote a severe critique of the new principle of equality before the law.

Necker initially held the finance post between July 1777 and 1781. In 1781, he earned widespread recognition for his unprecedented decision to publish the Compte rendu – thus making the country's budget public – "a novelty in an absolute monarchy where the state of finances had always been kept a secret." Necker was dismissed within a few months. By 1788, the inexorable compounding of interest on the national debt brought France to a fiscal crisis. Necker was recalled to royal service. His dismissal on 11 July 1789 was a factor in causing the Storming of the Bastille. Within two days, Necker was recalled by the king and the assembly. Necker entered France in triumph and tried to accelerate the tax reform process. Faced with the opposition of the Constituent Assembly, he resigned in September 1790 to a reaction of general indifference.

== Early life and career ==
Necker was born on 30 September 1732 in Geneva to Karl Friedrich Necker and Jeanne-Marie Gautier. His father was a lawyer from Küstrin in Neumark, Prussia (now Kostrzyn nad Odrą, Poland). After publishing some works, Karl Friedrich was appointed professor of public law at the Academy of Geneva in 1725, and later served in the city's Council of Two Hundred. After studying at the Academy of Geneva, Necker moved to Paris in 1748 and became a clerk in the bank of Isaac Vernet and Peter Thellusson. Soon after, he managed to learn Dutch and English. One day, he replaced the first clerk in charge of trading on the stock exchange, and through a sequence of trades, he made a quick profit of half a million French livres. In 1762, Vernet retired and Necker became a partner in the bank with Georges-Tobie de Thellusson (1728–1776) (Isaac de Thellusson's son) who managed the bank in London, while Necker served as his managing partner in Paris. In 1763, before the end of the Seven Years' War, he successfully speculated in British debentures or bonds, wheat, and possibly some shares, which he sold at a good profit in the next few years.

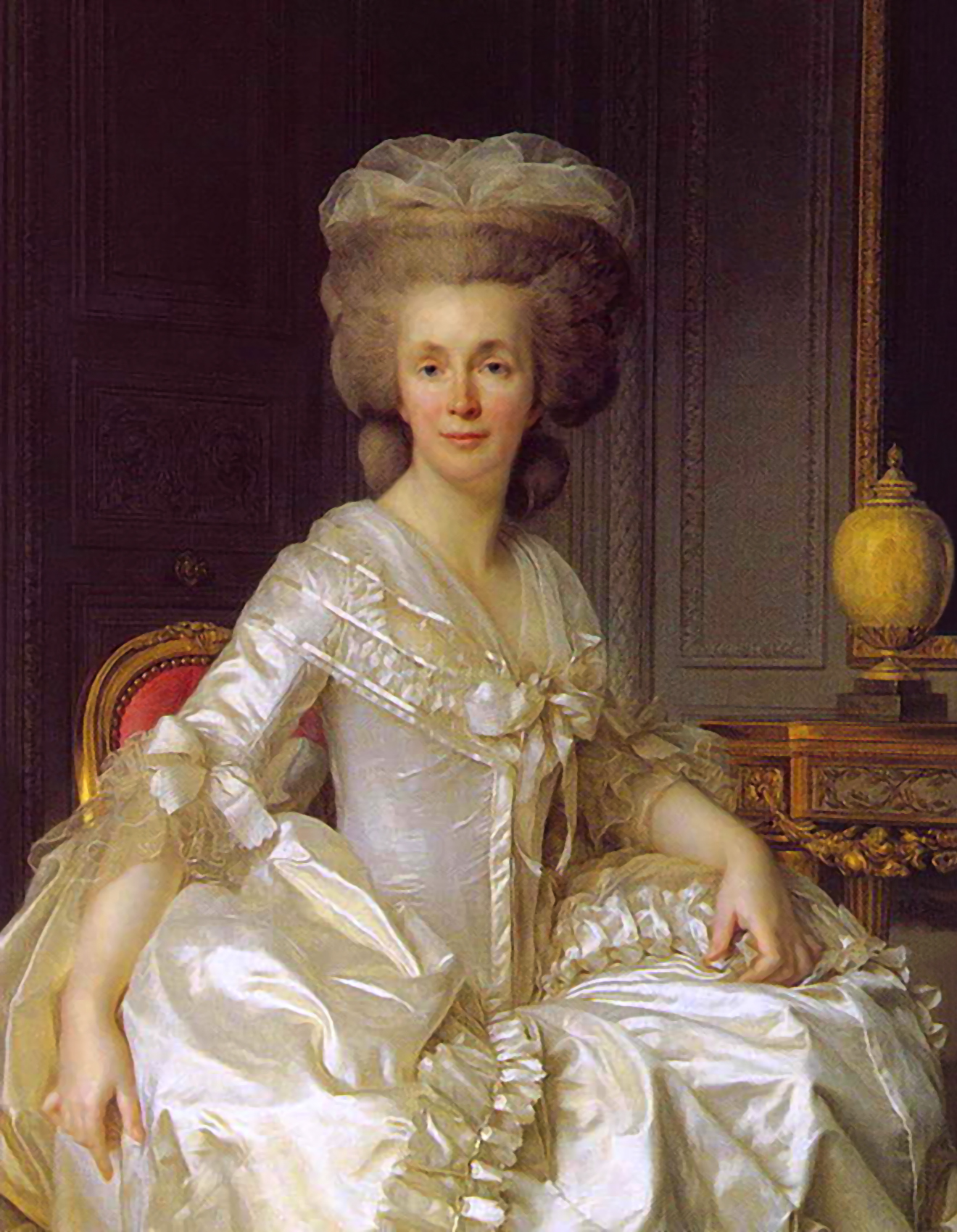
Suzanne Curchod, Necker's wife

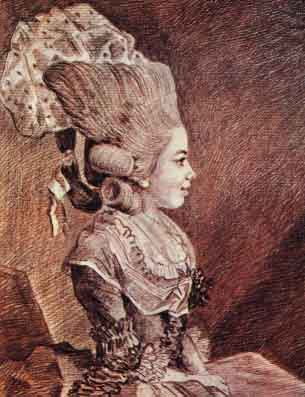
Daughter Germaine Necker by Carmontelle 1780

Necker had fallen in love with Madame Anne Germaine de Vermenoux, the young widow of a French officer. When she went to see Théodore Tronchin in Geneva, she met the well-educated Suzanne Curchod. In 1764, Madame de Verménoux brought Mademoiselle Curchod with her from Geneva to Paris as a companion for Thelusson's children. Suzanne was engaged to British historian Edward Gibbon, but he was forced to break the engagement in 1762. Necker transferred his love from the wealthy widow to the ambitious Swiss governess, gifted in writing; they married in 1764. In 1766, they moved to Rue de Cléry and had a daughter, Anne Louise Germaine, who grew to become the famed author and salonnière Madame de Staël.

Madame Necker encouraged her husband to try to find himself a public position. He, accordingly, became a syndic, or director, of the French East India Company, around which a fierce political debate revolved in the 1760s between the company's directors and shareholders and the royal ministry over its administration and the company's autonomy. After showing his financial ability in its management, Necker defended the company's autonomy in an able memoir against the attacks of Morellet in 1769. As the company never made any profit during its existence, the monopoly ended. The era of free trade had begun. Necker bought up the company's ships and stock of unsold goods when it went bankrupt in 1769.

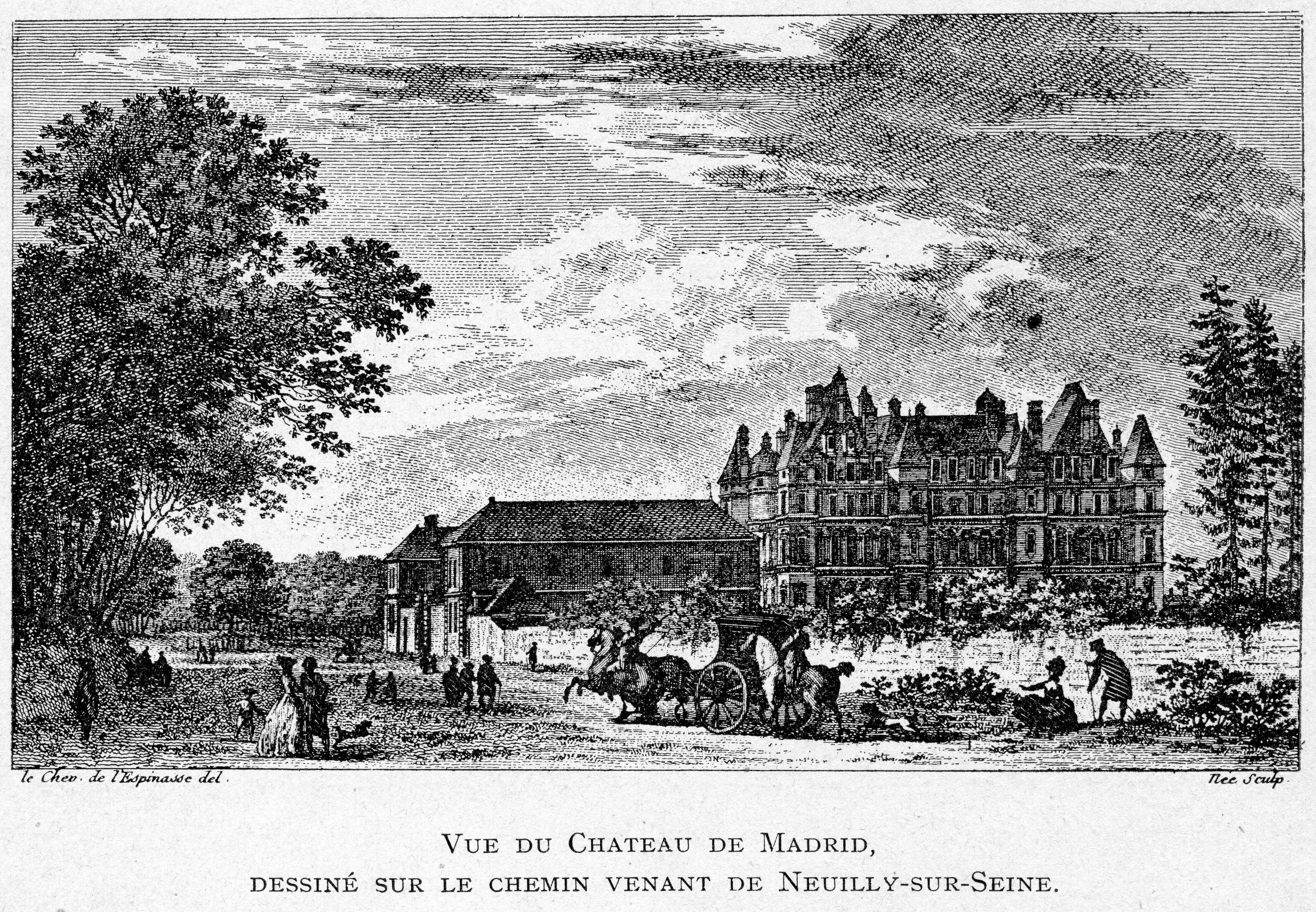
Château de Madrid, Necker's home in Neuilly-sur-Seine

From 1768 to 1776, he made loans to the French government in the form of life annuities and by lottery operations. His wife made him give up his share in the bank, which he transferred to his brother Louis Necker and Jean Girardot in 1772. In 1773, Necker won the prize of the Académie Française for a defense of state corporatism framed as a eulogy in honor of Louis XIV's minister Jean-Baptiste Colbert. Necker's capital amounted to six or eight million livres, and he used Château de Madrid as a summer house. In 1775, in Essai sur la législation et le commerce des grains, he attacked the physiocrats, like Ferdinando Galiani, and questioned the laissez-faire policies of Turgot, the Controller-General of Finances. Turgot had made too many enemies; in May 1776, he was dismissed. But his successor, Clugny de Nuis, died in October. Therefore, on 22 October 1776, on the recommendation of Maurepas, Necker was appointed "Directeur du trésor royal". (As a Protestant, Necker could not serve as Controller.)

== Finance Minister of France ==
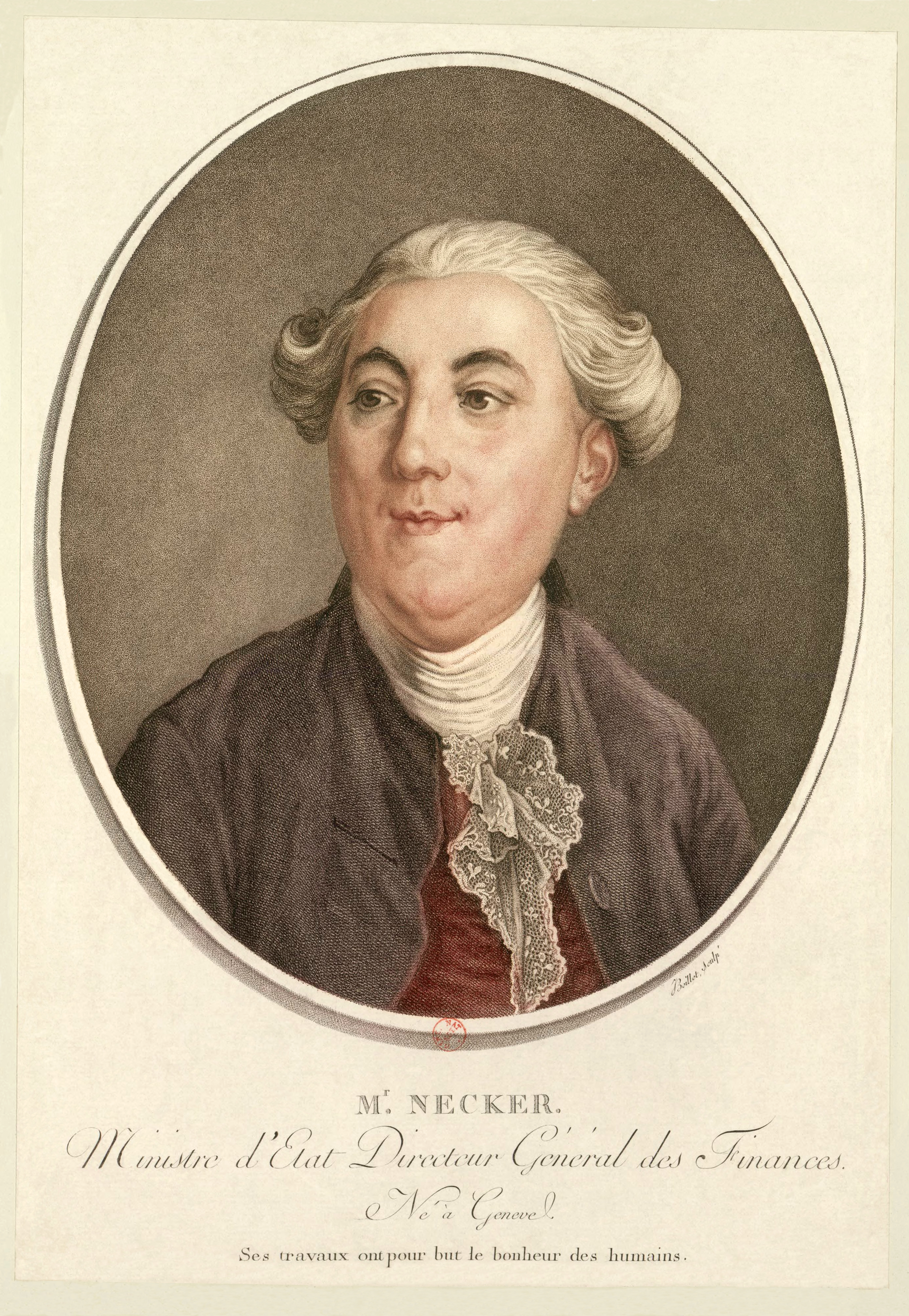

On 29 June 1777, according to his daughter in her "Vie privée de Mr Necker" he was made director-general of the royal treasury and not Controller-General of Finance which was impossible because of his Protestant faith. Necker refused a salary, but he was not admitted to the Royal Council. He gained popularity through regulating the government's finances by attempting to divide the taille and the capitation tax more equally, abolishing a tax known as the vingtième d'industrie, (a value-added tax) and establishing monts de piété (pawnshop-like establishments for loaning money on security). Necker tried through careful reforms (abolition of pensions, mortmain, droit de suite and more fair taxation) to rehabilitate the disorganized state budget. He abolished over five hundred sinecures and superfluous posts. Together with his wife, he visited and improved life in hospitals and prisons. In April 1778 he remitted 2.4 million livres from his own fortune to the royal treasury. Unlike Turgot – in his Mémoire sur les municipalités – Necker tried to install provincial assemblies and hoped they could serve as an effective means of reforming the Ancien régime. Necker succeeded only in Berry and Haute-Guyenne, where he installed assemblies with an equal number of members from the Third Estate.

His greatest financial measures were his use of loans to help fund the French debt and his use of high interest rates rather than raising taxes. The collection of indirect taxes was restored to the farmers-general (1780), but Necker reduced their number by a third and subjected them to sharper scrutiny and control. In September 1780, Necker asked for his dismissal, but the King refused to let him go.

=== Compte rendu au roi (Report to the King) ===
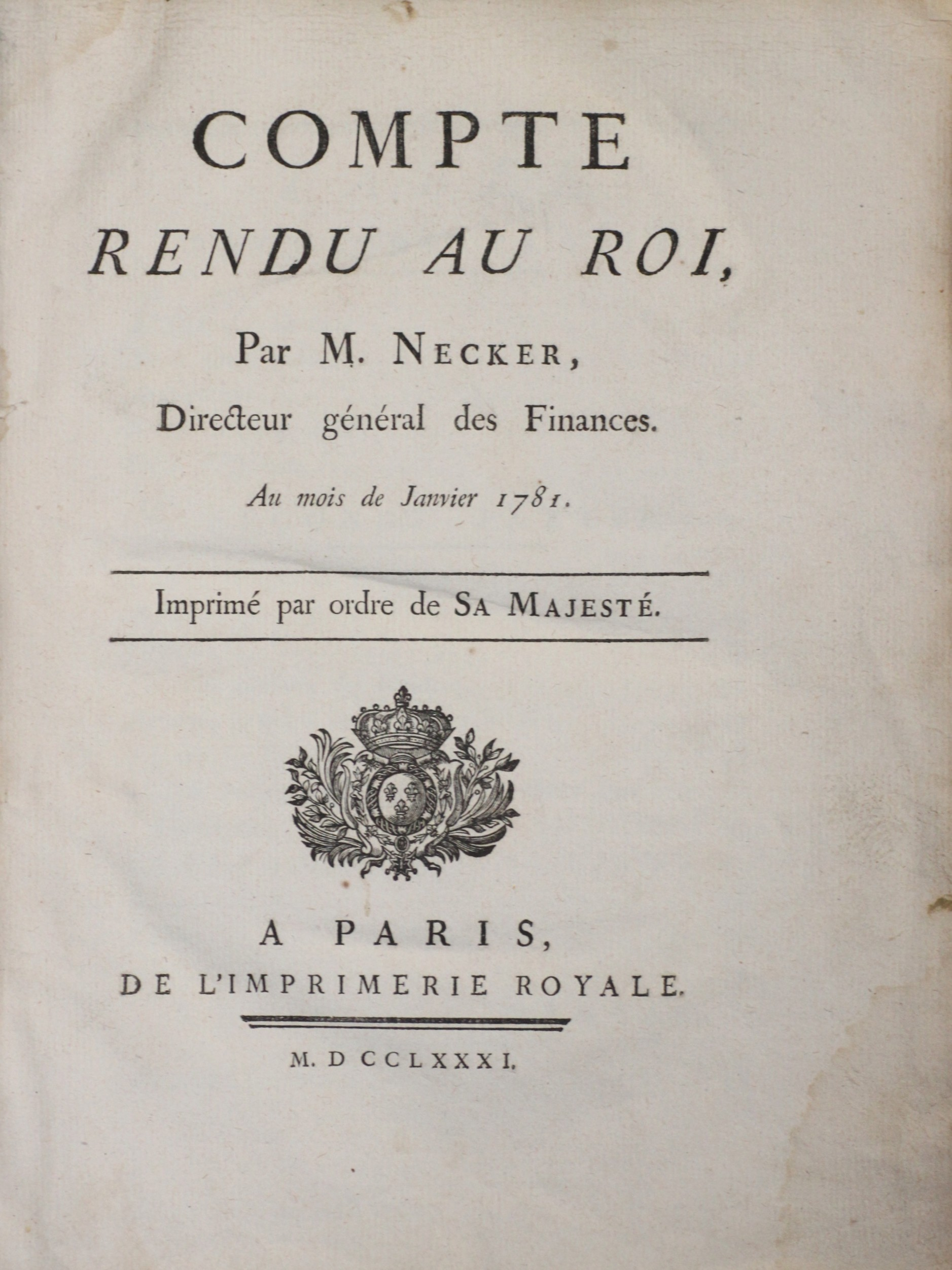

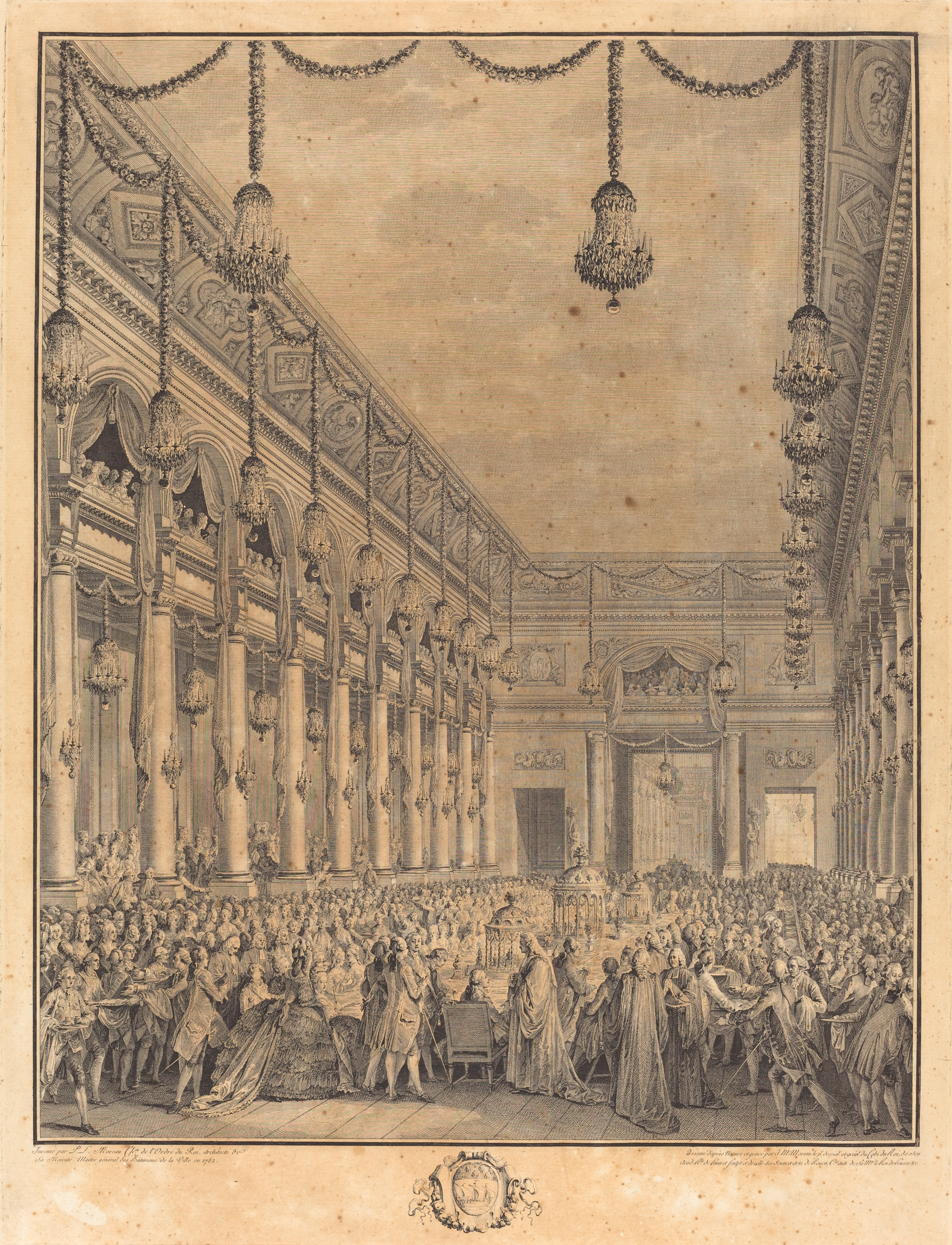
Jean-Michel Moreau, Le festin royal, 1782, NGA 2791

By 1781, France was suffering financially, and, as director-general of the royal treasury, he was blamed for the rather high debt accrued from the American Revolution. A series of pamphlets appeared, criticizing Necker. Jacques-Mathieu Augeard attacked him on his foreign origin, his faith, and economic choices. The main reason behind this was the action of Necker "cooking the books" or falsifying the records. He brightened the picture by excluding military outlays and other 'extraordinary' charges (Menus-Plaisirs du Roi) and ignoring the national debt. Both Necker and Calonne were deceived with the number of pensions and gratifications. The king spent much more on his brothers than on public health. After Necker had shown Louis XVI his annual report, the king tried to keep its contents secret. Necker met the challenge aggressively by asking the King to bring him into the royal council. In revenge, Necker made the Compte rendu au roi public; in no time between 200,000 copies were sold. It was rapidly translated into Dutch, German, Danish, Italian and English.

In his most influential work, which brought him instant fame, Necker summarized governmental income and expenditures to provide the first record of royal finances ever made public. The Account was meant to be an educational piece for the people, and in it, he expressed his desire to create a well-informed, interested populace. Before, the people had never considered governmental income and expenditure to be their concern, but the Compte rendu made them more proactive.

Maurepas became jealous, and Vergennes called him a revolutionist. Necker declared that he would resign unless given the full title and authority of a minister, with a seat on the Conseil du Roi. Both Maurepas and Vergennes replied that they would resign if this was done. When Necker was dismissed on 19 May 1781, people of all stations flocked to his home at St. Ouen. In August 1781 Madame Necker went as far as Utrecht to buy the libels that appeared in the name of Turgot against her husband. She even tried to have the booksellers arrested.

After his dismissal, Necker bought an estate in Coppet. His brother Louis purchased an estate in Cologny. Both estates were located near Lake Geneva. In retirement, Necker, believing in "credible policy", occupied himself with law and economics, producing his famous Traité de l'administration des finances de la France (1784). Calonne tried to prevent the distribution of the book in Paris. Never had a work on such a serious subject obtained such general success; 80,000 copies were sold.

=== Second term as Controller-General ===
The Necker family returned to the Paris region, supposing they were present at the wedding of their only daughter Germaine in January 1786. The impending national bankruptcy of France caused Calonne to convene an Assembly of notables under the elimination of parlements in order to enforce tax reforms. It had not met since 1626. One could not issue new loans without the Parlements' approval. In his speech, Calonne expressed doubts about Necker's statistics in the Compte rendu. According to him, they were false and misleading, as the state revenues had been revised upwards. For Calonne, the French deficit was caused by Necker, who had not raised the taxes. However, Calonne got involved in several financial scandals regarding the "Calonne Company" and was dismissed by the king on 8 April 1787. On 11 April, Necker replied on the charges made by Calonne. Two days later Louis XVI banished Necker by a lettre de cachet for his very public exchange of pamphlets.

After two months, Necker was allowed to return to Paris. Necker published his Nouveaux éclaircissement sur le compte rendu. Also Louis Philippe II, Duke of Orléans and his secretary Charles-Louis Ducrest came up with proposals. The next minister of finance Loménie de Brienne resigned within fifteen months. On 24 August 1788; the king allowed him an enormous pension.

On 25 or 26 August, Necker was called back to office accompanied by fireworks. According to John Hardman, Marie-Antoinette helped to organise Necker's return to power. This time he insisted on the title of Controller-General of Finances and access to the royal council. Necker was appointed as Chief minister of France. He revoked the order of 16 August requiring bondholders to accept paper instead of money; government bonds rose 30% on the market.

In September 1788, Paris was on the verge of famine. Necker suspended the exportation of corn, purchased seventy million livres of wheat, and publicly reposted the decree of the King's Council of 23 April 1789 allowing police to inspect granaries and private inventories of grain, but none of these efforts could solve the problem. In 1788, insurrections broke out in Brittany, and Necker was sacked again. In a letter to Florimond Claude, Comte de Mercy-Argenteau, Marie-Antoinette took personal credit for forcing the king's hand on this matter. She believed that Necker would lessen the King's authority and wrote "the moment is pressing. It is very essential that Necker should accept."

=== Impact of the American Revolution ===
One of the most significant fiscal issues Necker faced was the American Revolutionary War and the resulting debt. The war was popular with almost every Frenchman, except Necker. For the first time, the king waged a war without raising the taxes. As France had financed its participation almost exclusively by municipal bonds, Necker warned of the consequences for the French national budget as the war continued. (The war had cost the state already ca. 1.5 billion livres.) The ministers of War and Navy were especially hostile towards him.

In 1781, Congress appointed Robert Morris as Superintendent of Finance after the US went bankrupt. In 1783, Morris cut off interest payments to France, its largest foreign creditor. This led Necker to seek funds from elsewhere. Nicolaas van Staphorst told Necker that the entire French debt might be redeemed without any loss through the Amsterdam capital markets. The Van Staphorsts made an offer for the American bonds. Necker warmed to the proposal but asked for collateral and the sanction of a large investment bank. Necker decided that without collateral or the sanction of a major investment bank, the proposal was not acceptable.

Thomas Jefferson, who had succeeded Franklin as American minister to France and John Adams as head of American finance in Europe in 1785, learned about the meeting between the Van Staphorsts' representatives and the French Minister of Finance only in November 1786, when he received a redacted document describing the Dutch offer from Étienne Clavière, a Genevan banker and pro-America.

The Dutch bankers advanced the treasury sufficient funds to forestall a crisis over the next year. The winter of 1788–89 was one of the bitterest in history. By the summer of 1789, the population suffered from famine. Necker intervened personally and successfully at the Amsterdam bank Hope & Co. to supply the 'King of France' with grain. He used the 2.4 million livres in the royal treasury as a collateral.

== The one non-noble minister ==
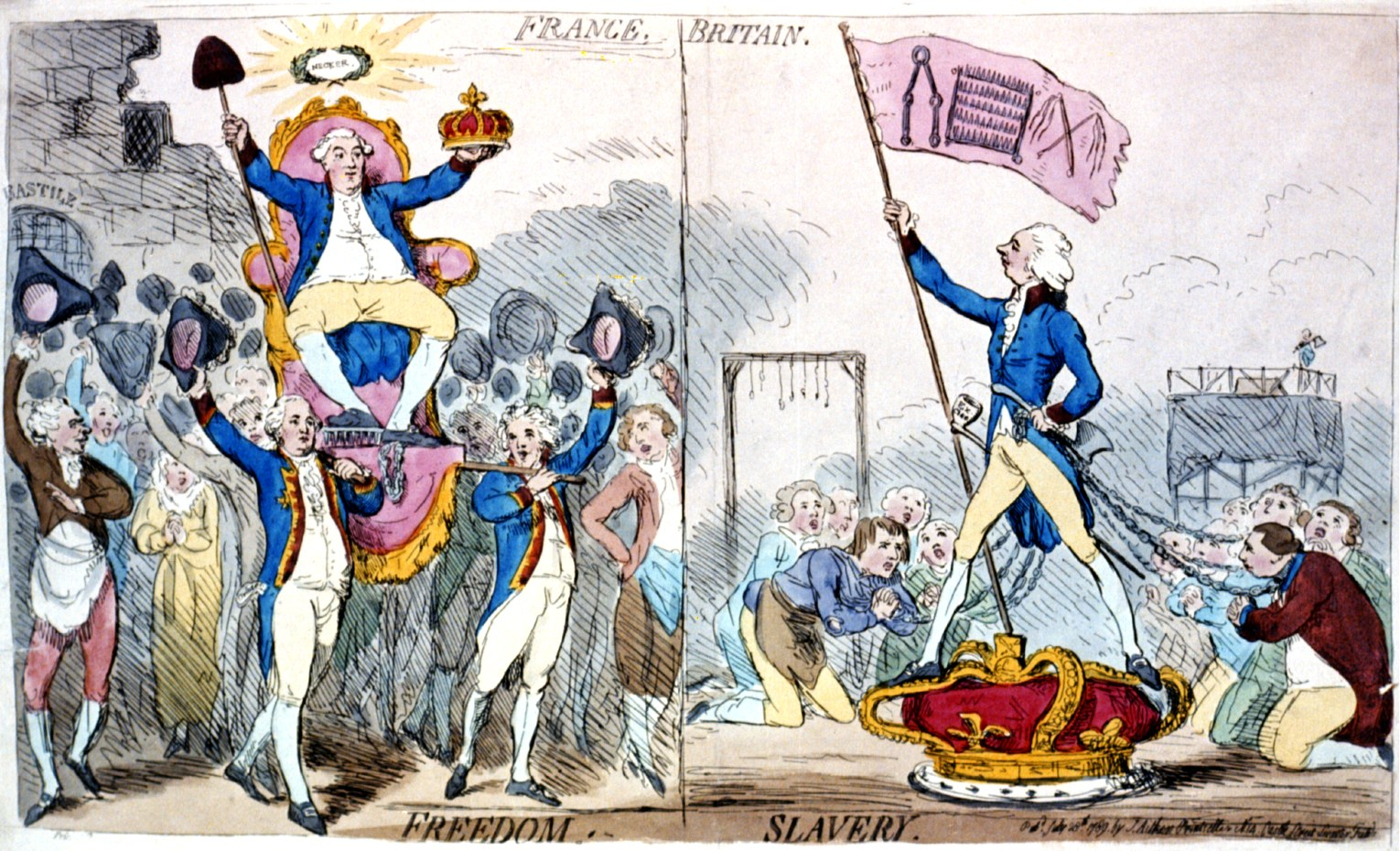
In this 1789 engraving, James Gillray caricatures the triumph of Necker (seated, on left) in 1789, comparing its effects on freedom unfavorably to those of William Pitt the Younger in Britain. France has the caption "Freedom," while Britain has the caption "Slavery."

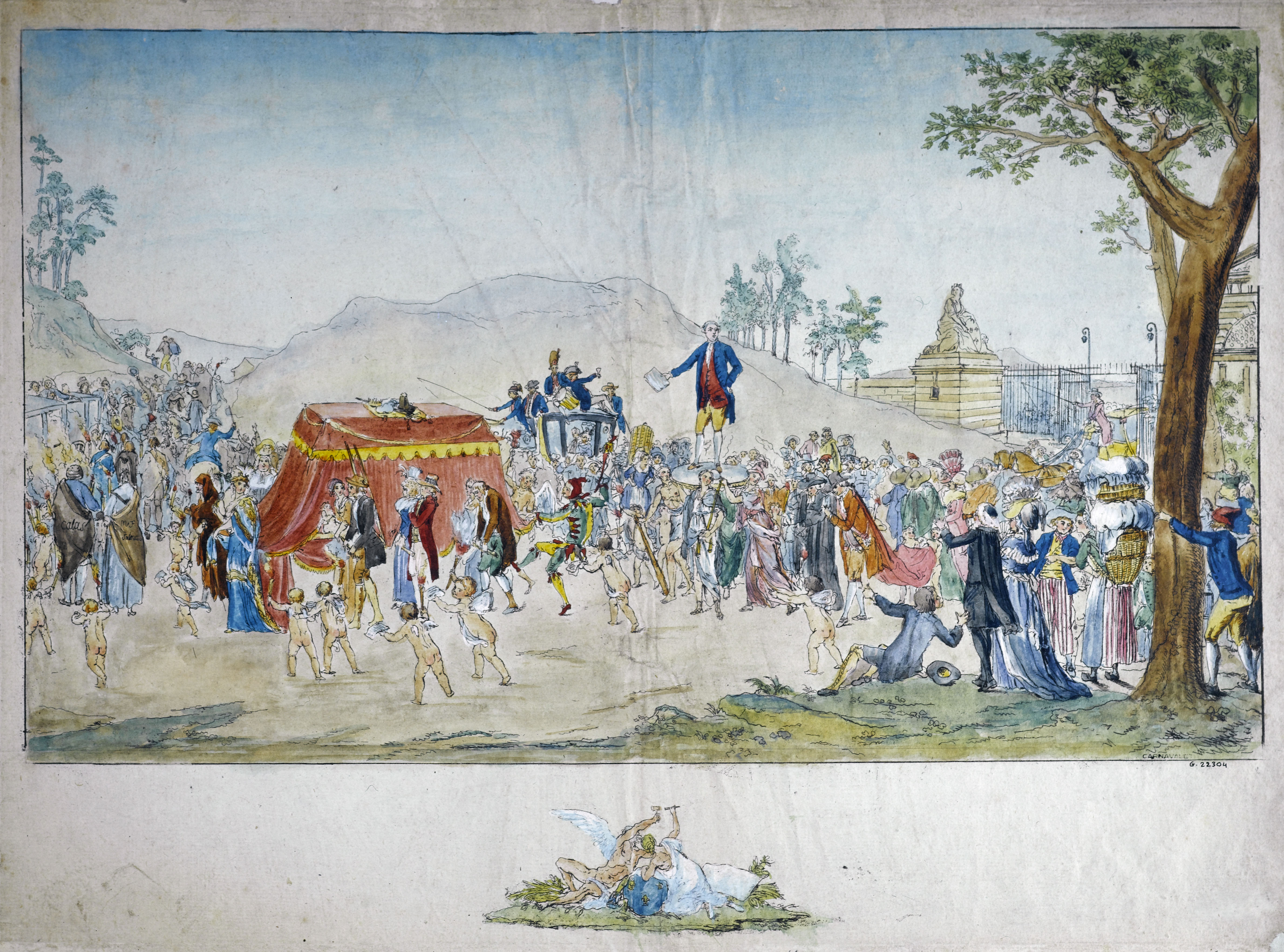
A caricature by Jean Marie Mixelle in 1789 celebrates the allegorical death of the "tres haut et tres puissant seigneur des Abus" (or, the "very high and powerful Lord of Abuses"). Necker is carried behind the coffin, surrounded by citizens from all corners of French society, as well as victims of injustice, including Jean Calas and Jeanne d'Arc.

By the time of his second term in office, Necker desired a more limited monarchy and favored increased power for the Estates General. According to Peter Kropotkin, Necker "helped to shake down the system which was already tottering to its fall, but he was powerless to prevent the fall from becoming a revolution: probably he did not even perceive that it was impending."

Necker succeeded in doubling the representation of the Third Estate to satisfy the nation's people. The Third Estate had as many deputies as the other two orders together. His address at the Estates-General on 5 May 1789 about the fundamental problems as financial health, constitutional monarchy, and institutional and political reforms lasted three hours. Necker suffered from a cold and, after fifteen minutes, he asked the secretary of the Agricultural Society to read the remainder. He invited the representatives to leave aside their factional interests and take into consideration the general, long-term interests of the nation. Personal rivalries and radical claims had to give way to a pragmatic spirit of moderation and conciliation. He concluded:

"Finally, gentlemen, you will not be envious of what only time can achieve, and you will leave something for it to do. For if you attempt to reform everything that seems imperfect, your work will lead to poor results."

According to Simon Schama, he "appeared to consider the Estates-General to be a facility designed to help the administration rather than to reform government". Two weeks later, Necker seems to have sought to persuade the king to adopt a constitution similar to that of Great Britain and advised him in the strongest possible terms to make the necessary concessions before it was too late. According to François Mignet, "he hoped to reduce the number of orders, and bring about the adoption of the English form of government, by uniting the clergy and nobility in one chamber, and the third estate in another." Necker warned the king that unless the privileged orders yielded, the Estates-General would collapse, taxes would not be paid, and the government would be bankrupt.

On 17 June 1789, the first act of the new National Assembly declared all existing taxes illegal. Necker had legitimate reasons to be concerned about the implications of this unprecedented decision. On 23 June, the king proposed to the royal council the dissolution of the Assembly. On 11 July, the king advised Necker to leave the country immediately. According to Jean Luzac, Necker and his wife went for a walk in a park. They then got into their carriage to drive to their estate in Saint-Ouen at seven in the evening. When the news became known the next day, it enraged Camille Desmoulins. Wax heads of Necker and the Duc d'Orléans were taken through the streets to the Tuileries. The Royal Guard allegedly chose to open fire rather than salute the likenesses. The threat of a counter-revolution caused citizens to take up arms and storm the Bastille on 14 July. The king and the Assembly recalled the immensely popular Necker to a third ministry in a letter dated 16 July. Necker replied from Basle on the 23rd. He wrote to his brother that he was going back to the abyss. His successor, the 74-year-old Joseph Foullon de Doué, was hanged from a lamppost on the 22nd. His entry into Versailles on the 29th was a festival day. Necker demanded a pardon for Baron de Besenval, who was imprisoned after given command of the troops concentrated in and around Paris early July.

On 4 August 1789, the day when feudalism was abolished by the National Assembly, Necker is quoted as saying, "The collectors of the taille are at their last shift."

=== Assignats ===
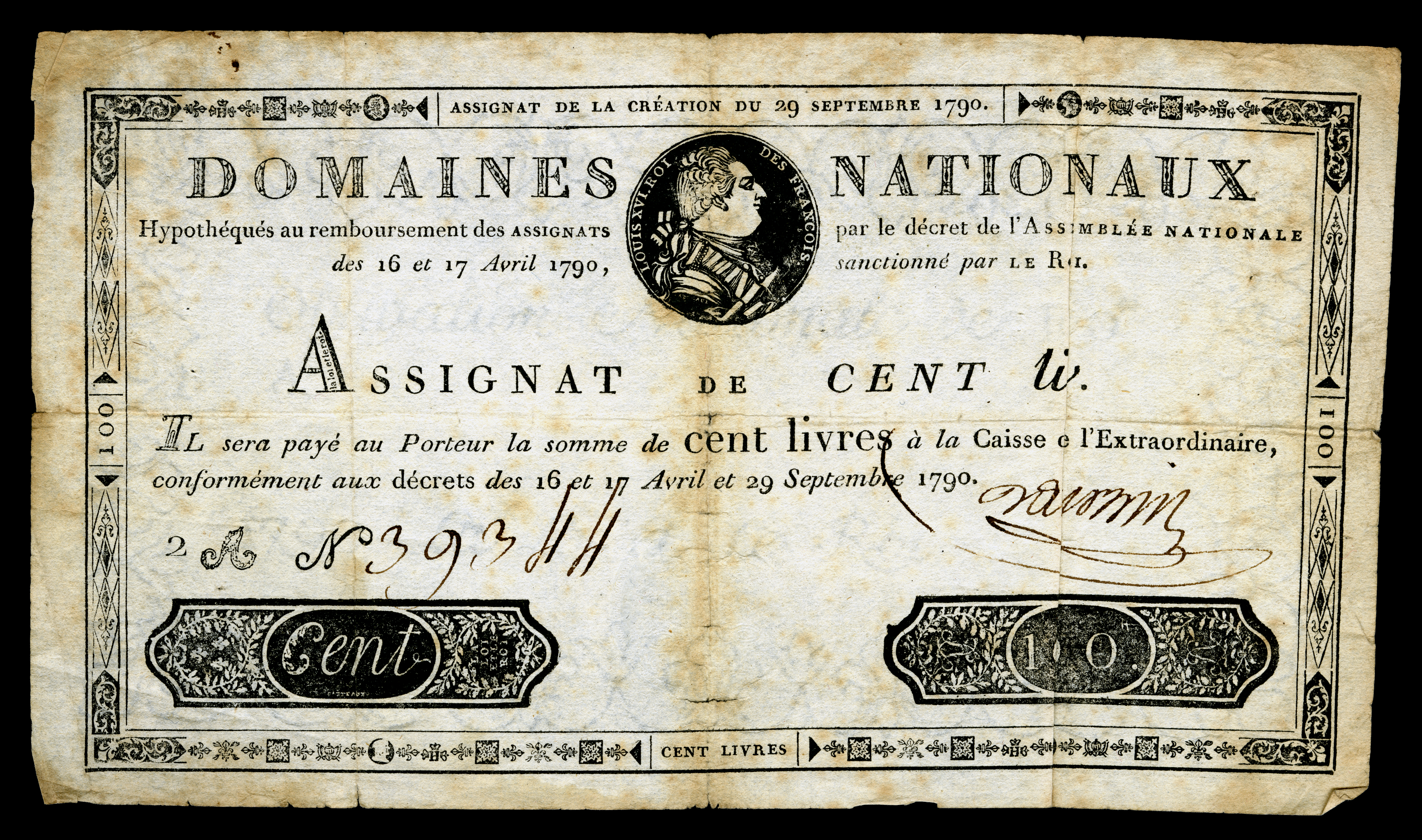
Early French banknote issue by Domaines Nationaux – Assignat for 100 livres, 1790 Issue

Necker proved to be powerless as tax revenue dropped quickly. Credit was wrecked, according to Talleyrand; for Mirabeau "the deficit was the treasure of the nation" as it had made many changes possible. By September, the treasury was empty. According to Marat, the whole famine was the work of one man, accusing Necker of buying up all the corn on every side, in order that Paris had none. Talleyrand proposed that "national goods" be given back to the nation. In November 1789, ecclesiastical possessions were confiscated by the state. Necker proposed to borrow from the Caisse d'Escompte, but his intention to change the private bank into a national bank similar to the Bank of England failed. A general bankruptcy seemed certain. Mirabeau proposed to Lafayette to overthrow Necker. On 21 December 1789, a first decree was voted through, ordering the issue (in April 1790) of 400 million assignats, certificates of indebtedness of 1,000 livres each, with an interest rate of 5%, secured and repayable based on the auctioning of the "Biens nationaux". Once the assignats were paid, they had to be destroyed or burnt.

In January 1790, Necker obtained an order of arrest against Jean-Paul Marat, for having "had openly espoused the cause of the people, the poorest classes," according to Peter Kropotkin. Marat was forced to flee to London. On 10 March 1790, on the proposition of Pétion, the administration of the church property was transferred to the municipalities. At the same time, Étienne Clavière lobbied for large issues of assignats representing national wealth and operating as legal tender. For daily life, smaller denominations were needed and extended to the whole of France. On 17 April 1790, the new notes of 200 and 300 livres were declared legal tender but their interest was reduced to 3%. The assignats would compensate for the scarcity of coin and would revive industry and trade.

In May 1790, the feudal and ecclesiastical properties were sold against assignats. Constitutional monarchists such as Maury, Cazalès, Bergasse and d'Eprémesnil opposed it. The deputies in the Convention prepared a surety for future issues of paper money (on 19 June and 29 July). Half of the taxes over the preceding year were still not received. People who earned more than 400 livres were invited to go to their municipality and fulfill their duty. As it was not the final cure, Necker asked his friends, the Geneva "banquiers", to pay the arrears the Assembly turned it down. The political scene came to be dominated by "clamorous spectators, passionate judges, and ungovernable agitators". Necker was continuously attacked by Jean-Paul Marat in his pamphlets and by Jacques-René Hébert in his newspaper. Count Mirabeau, who played a decisive role in the Assembly, accused him of complete financial dictatorship. For Mirabeau, to express doubts in the assignats was to express doubts in the revolution.

At the end of August, the government was again in distress; four months after the first issue the money was spent. Montesquiou-Fézensac, the teacher of Mirabeau, presented a report in the Assembly. Assignats should be used not only for payment of church property.

Montesquiou had massively exaggerated the amount of the redeemable debt, probably to convince the Assembly. On 27 August 1790, the Assembly decided another issue of 1.9 billion assignats which would become legal tender before the end of the year. Necker endeavored to dissuade the Assembly from the proposed issue; suggesting that other means could be found for accomplishing the result, and he predicted terrible evils. Necker was not backed by Comte de Mirabeau, his strongest opponent who called for "national money" and won that day. A few crowds were sent to shout and threaten him. When all resources were exhausted, the Assembly created paper money, according to Necker. He handed in his resignation on 3 September. The massive and dangerous issue of 1.9 billion he succeeded to get down to 800 million, but the attacks influenced his resignation. Necker did not step down on the decision to make the assignat legal tender. Instead, the choice to issue the paper money along with political opposition proved to be his main motivators.

The Assembly decreed that it would itself direct the public Treasury. Necker foretold that the paper money, with which the dividends were about to be paid, would soon be of no value. Du Pont de Nemours feared the emission of assignats would double the price of bread. Since no one had truly the right to make assignats, everyone would soon begin to do so. Montesquiou-Fézensac, charged with the issue of assignats, feared stockjobbing and greed. A declaration (14 Oct) suspending all interest payments turned the assignats into fiat money.

Necker's efforts to keep the financial situation afloat were ineffective. His popularity vanished and he resigned with a damaged reputation. Necker left leaving two million livres in the public treasury; he took 1/5 of the amount with him.

== Retirement ==
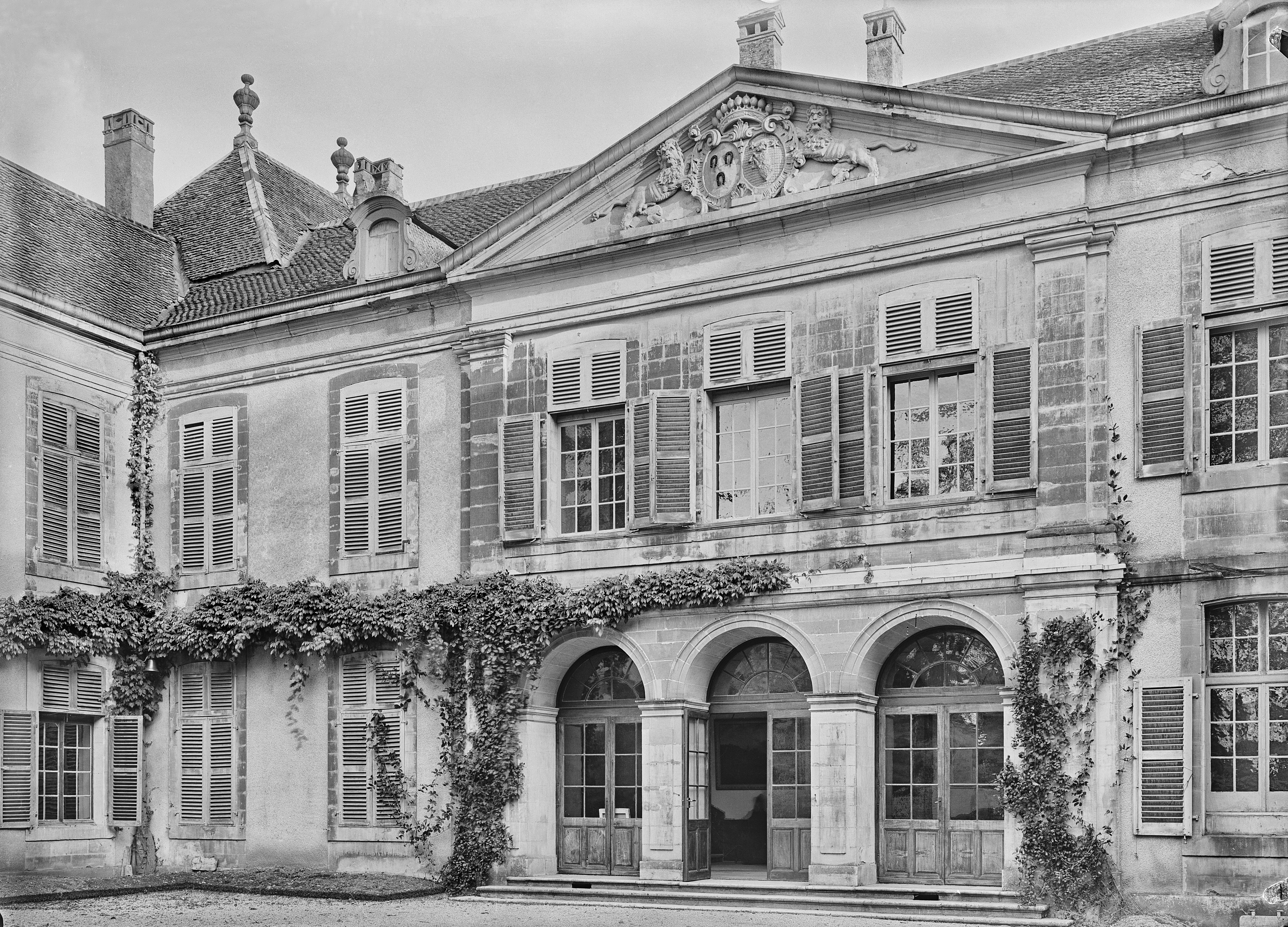
Château de Coppet

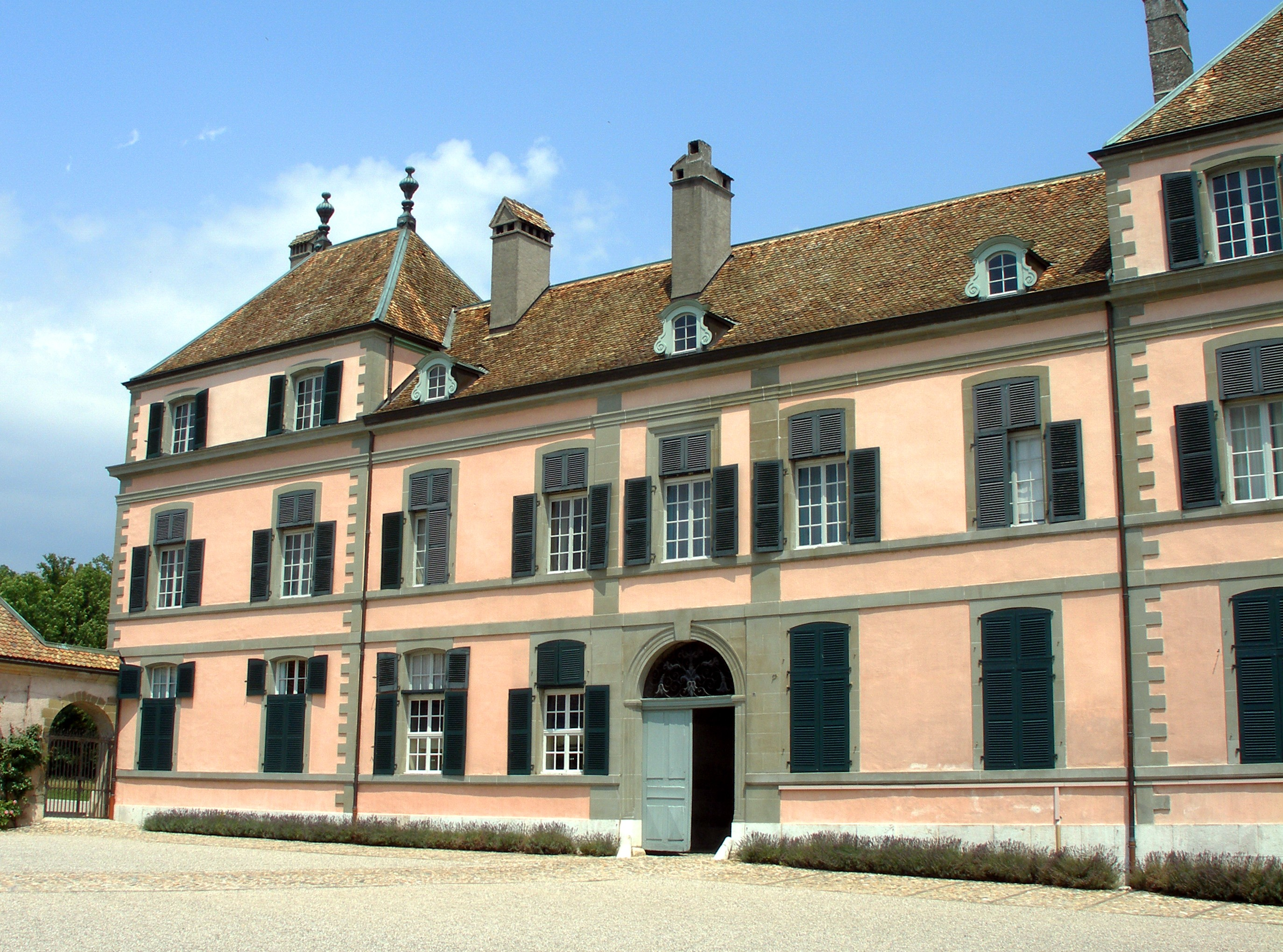
Schloß Coppet

Necker, suspected of reactionary tendencies, traveled east to Arcis-sur-Aube and Vesoul, where he was arrested, but on 11 September he was allowed to leave the country. At Coppet Castle, he occupied himself with political economy, and law. At the end of 1792, he published a brochure on the trial against Louis XVI. The Neckers were far from welcome in Geneva. Many of the French émigrés considered them Jacobins, and many of the Swiss Jacobins thought them conservative.

Initially living in Rolle, the Neckers moved to an apartment in Beaulieu Castle following the installation of a revolutionary government in Geneva. After being put on the list of Émigrés, Necker was not paid any interest on the money he had left in the treasury. His house in Rue de la Chaussée-d'Antin, his estate in Saint-Ouen sûr Seine, and the two million livres were confiscated by the French government. Mme Necker, who had always seen herself as ill, sank into mental illness. Since the birth of Germaine, she was correcting the most morbid clauses of her will and insisted to be embalmed by Samuel-Auguste Tissot, preserved and exhibited in a bedroom for four months. He continued to live under the care of his daughter. By 1794, France would be flooded by false assignats. But his time was past, and his books had except abroad no political influence. In 1795 Germaine moved to Paris with her lover Benjamin Constant, but she came back, sometimes involuntary, and founded the Cercle de Coppet.

In March 1798, Bern was attacked during the French invasion of Switzerland. Necker was treated with respect when the army passed his mansion. In July 1798, he was removed from the list of Émigrés. His house in the 9th arrondissement of Paris was sold to (or occupied by?) the husband of Juliette Récamier. In early June 1800, Necker met Napoleon who was on his way to Marengo. In confidence, Napoleon told him about his plans to reestablish a monarchy in France. The publication of Necker's "Last Views on Politics and Finance" in 1802 upset the first consul. He threatened to exile Madame de Staël from Paris because of this book. Although Necker had never been a republican before, toward the end of his life, he engaged seriously with the project of creating and consolidating a republic "one and indivisible" in France. Necker then foretold the suppression of the Tribunat as it took place under the French Consulate. His claim of two million on the state treasury was not recognized by the Sénat conservateur.

Necker died in 1804. He was buried next to his wife in the garden of Coppet Castle. The mausoleum was sealed in 1817 following Germaine's death. The Charter of 1814 signed by Louis XVIII at Saint-Ouen sûr Seine contained almost all the articles in support of liberty proposed by Necker before the Revolution of 14 July 1789. Therefore, George Armstrong Kelly called him the "grandfather of Restoration Liberalism."

"Posterity has not been fair to Necker," according to Aurelian Craiutu. On 11 August 1792, the day after the Storming of the Tuileries, all the busts were removed from the town hall, including the one of Necker by Jean-Antoine Houdon, and smashed. Like Mirabeau, the Marquis De Lafayette, Barnave and Pétion, Necker was only temporarily supported by the people.

== Personal life ==
In 1786 Necker's daughter Germaine married Swedish baron Erik Magnus Staël von Holstein; she was to become a prominent figure in her own right and a leading opponent of Napoleon Bonaparte. On 22 March 1814, she was promised 21 years of interest on her father's investment in the public treasury. After his death his daughter published "Vie privée de Mr. Necker". His grandson Auguste de Staël (1790–1827) edited the Complete Oeuvres by Jacques Necker.

His nephew Jacques Necker (1757–1825), a botanist, married Albertine Necker de Saussure. They took care of their uncle after his wife had died in 1794. Their son was the geologist and crystallographer Louis Albert Necker de Saussure.

== Places named after Jacques Necker ==
- Necker Hospital for Children (Paris, France)
- Necker Island (Northwestern Hawaiian Islands)
- Necker middle school (Coppet, Switzerland)

== Works ==
- Réponse au mémoire de M. l'abbé Morellet sur la Compagnie des Indes, 1769
- Éloge de Jean-Baptiste Colbert, 1773
- Sur la Législation et le commerce des grains, 1775
- Mémoire au roi sur l'établissement des administrations provinciales, 1776
- Lettre au roi, 1777
- Compte rendu au roi, 1781
- De l'administration des finances de la France. Tome I; Tome II; Tome III, 1784, 3 vol. in-8°
- Correspondance de M. Necker avec M. de Calonne. (29 janvier-28 février 1787), 1787
- Sur le compte rendu au Roi en 1781. Nouveaux éclaircissements. A Paris, Hotel de Thou, 1788
- De la Morale naturelle, suivie du Bonheur des sots, 1788
- De l'importance des opinions religieuses, 1788
- Supplément nécessaire à l'importance des opinions religieuses, 1788
- Sur le compte rendu au roi en 1781 : nouveaux éclaircissements, 1788
- Rapport fait au roi dans son conseil par le ministre des finances, 1789
- Derniers conseils au roi, 1789
- Hommage de M. Necker à la nation française, 1789
- Observations sur l'avant-propos du « Livre rouge », v. 1790
- Opinion relativement au décret de l'Assemblée nationale, concernant les titres, les noms et les armoiries, v. 1790
- Sur l'administration de M. Necker, 1791
- Réflexions présentées à la nation française sur le procès intenté à Louis XVI, 1792
- Du pouvoir exécutif dans les grands états. Tome premier; Tome second, 1792.
- De la Révolution Françoise. Tome premier; Tome second; Tome troisieme; Tome quatrieme, 1796
- Cours de morale religieuse. Tome premier; Tome deuxième; Tome troisième, 1800
- Dernières vues de politique et de finance, offertes à la Nation française, 1802
- Manuscrits de M. Necker, publiés par sa fille (1804)
- Œuvres complètes de M. Necker. Tome premier; Tome second; Tome troisième; Tome quatrième; Tome cinquième; Tome sixième; Tome septième; Tome huitième; Tome neuvième; Tome dixième; Tome onzième; Tome douzième; Tome treizième; Tome quizième. Publiées par m. le Baron de Staël. 1820–1821
- Histoire de la Révolution française, depuis l'Assemblée des notables jusques et y compris la journée du 13 vendémiaire an IV (18 octobre 1795), 1821
