= Suzanne Curchod =

French-Swiss salonist (1737–1794)

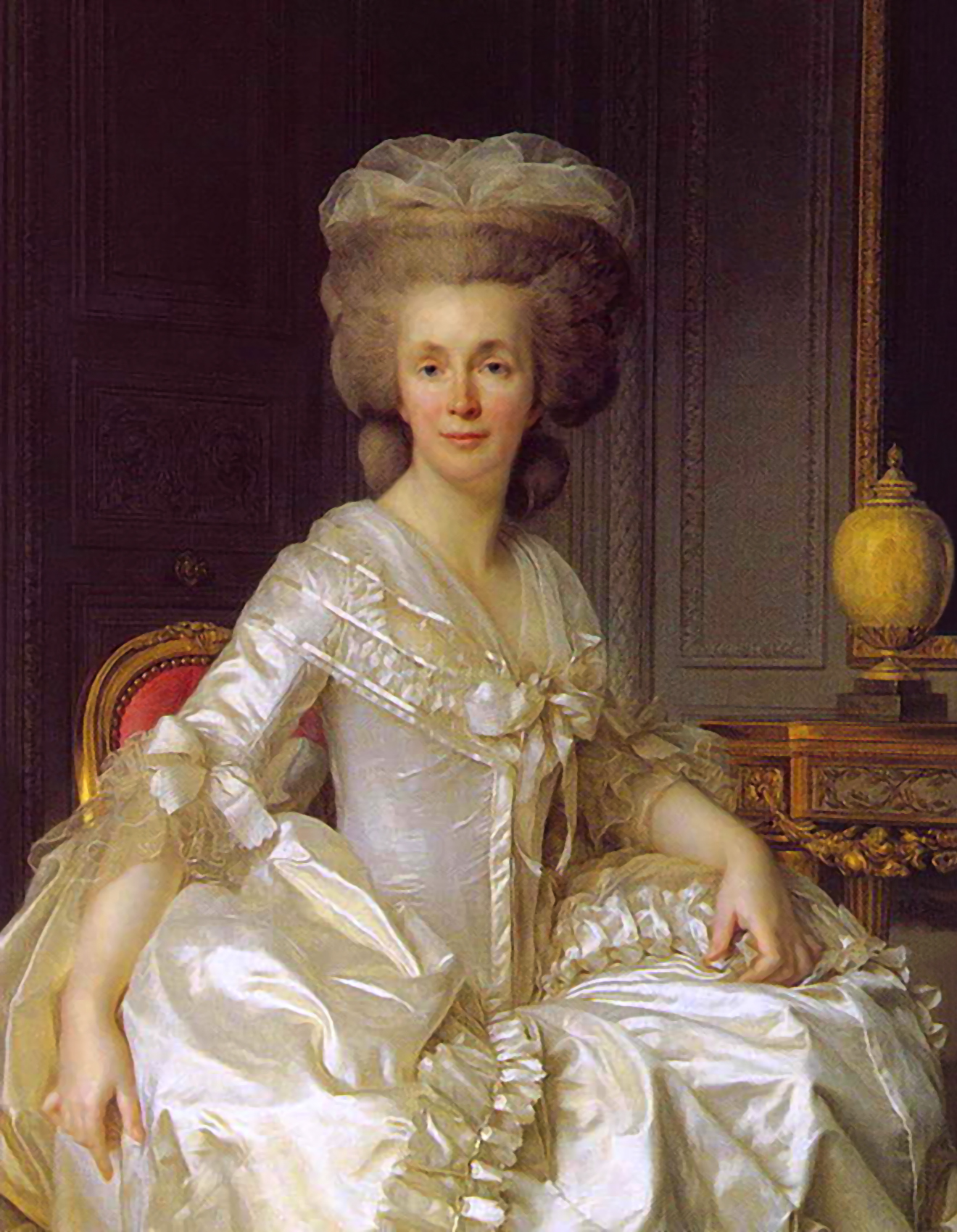
- Portrait by Joseph Duplessis
- Born: May 1737; Crassier, Switzerland
- Died: 6 May 1794 (aged 56–57); Beaulieu Castle, Lausanne, Switzerland
- Other name: Madame Necker
- Occupation: Salonist
- Known for: Necker–Enfants Malades Hospital
- Spouse: Jacques Necker (m. 1764)
- Children: Anne Louise Germaine (1766–1817)

Suzanne Curchod (French: [syzan kyʁʃo]; 1737 – 6 May 1794) was a French-Swiss salonist and writer. She hosted one of the most celebrated salons of the Ancien Régime. She also led the development of the Hospice de Charité, a model small hospital in Paris that still exists today as the Necker-Enfants Malades Hospital. She was the wife of French finance minister Jacques Necker, and is often referenced in historical documents as Madame Necker.

== Early life and education ==
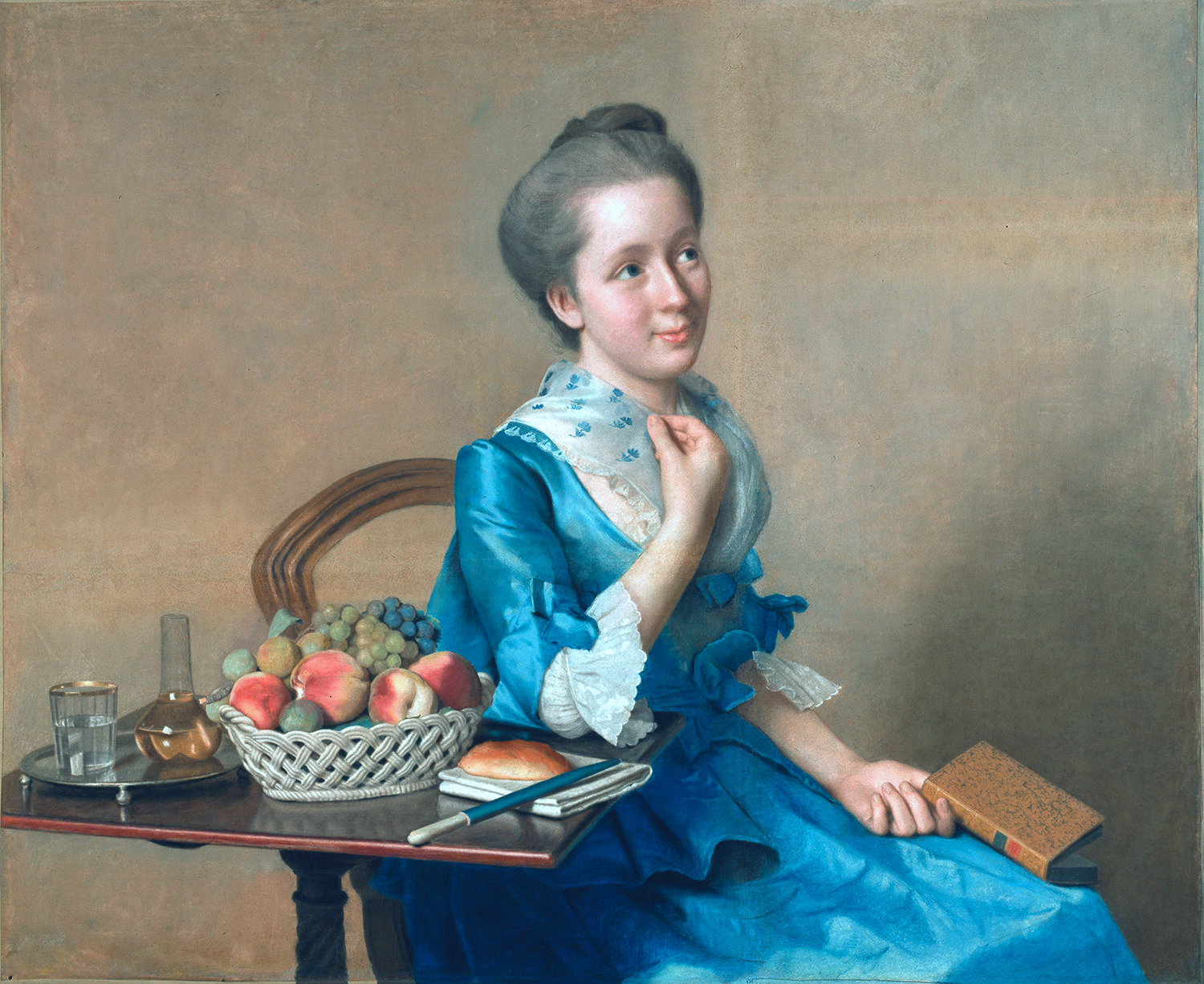
Portrait by Jean-Étienne Liotard, c. 1761

Born in May 1737, Curchod was the daughter of Louis Antoine Curchod, Protestant pastor of the Swiss village of Crassier near Lausanne, and Magdelaine d'Albert de Nasse. The family was of modest means, but Suzanne was well educated (largely by her father), becoming fluent in Latin and showing aptitude for mathematics and science. Her first salon was a literary group called the Académie des Eaux comprising a circle of Lausanne-based students with Curchod as president.

In 1757 Curchod met the historian Edward Gibbon, who fell in love with her, writing in a later recollection of their courtship that he "found her learned without pedantry, lively in conversation, pure in sentiment, and elegant in manners." He wished to marry her, but paternal disapproval on both sides, Gibbon's own wavering, and Suzanne's refusal to leave Switzerland for England thwarted their plans. Gibbon broke off the engagement in 1762, an event that fell in between the deaths of Curchod's parents in 1760 and 1763.

With the loss of income resulting from the death of her father, Curchod and her mother were left very poor, a situation she coped with by giving lessons. After her mother died, she became a companion to a young French widow, Madame de Vermenoux, who took her to Paris around 1763 or 1764. At the time, Madame de Vermenoux was being courted by the ambitious Swiss financier Jacques Necker but was uncertain whether she wanted to remarry at all. Within a few months, however, Necker turned his attention to Curchod, and in 1764 the two were married. They had one child, a daughter named Anne Louise Germaine, the future writer and philosopher now better known as Madame de Staël.

== Life in Paris ==
In 1777, Madame Necker's husband became Director-General of Finances, head of the French finance ministry under King Louis XVI, a position he gained in spite of the double disadvantage of his Protestant religion and Swiss origins. He owed much of his success to his wife's salon, where the luminaries of Parisian society gathered to discuss art, literature, and politics. Among the regular visitors were Jean-François Marmontel, Jean-François de La Harpe, the Comte de Buffon, the Baron von Grimm, Gabriel Bonnot de Mably, Jacques-Henri Bernardin de Saint-Pierre, Antoine Léonard Thomas, and the compilers of the Encyclopédie including Denis Diderot and Jean le Rond d'Alembert. Madame Necker's salons were also a meeting place for Swiss expatriates such as Marie Thérèse Rodet Geoffrin and Marie Anne de Vichy-Chamrond, marquise du Deffand. It was at one of Madame Necker's dinners that a group of men of letters first proposed starting a subscription to pay for a statue of Voltaire by the sculptor Jean-Baptiste Pigalle. His statue of a nude Voltaire was finished in 1776 and is now in the Louvre. Madame Necker carried on an extensive correspondence with Grimm, Buffon, Thomas, Marmontel, and others of these men of letters, especially when they were away from Paris.

The time commitment involved in running a salon, combined with her husband's dislike of bluestocking authors, prevented Madame Necker from pursuing her interest in writing to the extent she desired. Her surviving writings are few: a memoir about the establishment of hospitals (Mémoire sur l'Etablissement des hospices, 1786) and some reflections on divorce (Réflexions sur le divorce, 1794). She devoted considerable time to ensuring that their daughter Germaine received the very best education possible.

== Hospice de Charité ==
The French hospital system during the 18th century was not well standardized and overall lacked good patient care. Hospital conditions were unsatisfactory, especially due to overcrowding, as exemplified by the Hôtel-Dieu de Paris. After visiting this hospital, French Encyclopedist Denis Diderot described it this way:

The biggest, roomiest, richest and most terrifying of all hospitals...Imagine every kind of patient, sometimes packed three, four, five, or six into a bed, the living alongside the dead and dying, the air polluted by this mass of sick bodies, passing the pestilential germs of their affections from one to the other, and the spectacle of suffering and agony on every hand.

These kinds of harsh conditions prompted discussion of hospital reform among government officials. They called for improvements to the hospital environment and for strategic siting of hospitals to make it easier for families to visit hospital-bound relatives. As finance minister, Jacques Necker was particularly influential in steering the agreed reforms.

One of the first of the proposed "neighborhood hospitals" was the Hospice de Charité, a small-scale hospital located in a vacated monastery. Responsibility for its development was placed on Madame Necker, and she turned it into a facility with a 120-patient capacity. She enlisted the services of around a dozen Sisters of Charity, the women who traditionally managed the day-to-day tasks and tended to patients in French hospitals.

The new hospital began accepting patients in 1778, serving the areas of St. Sulpice and du Gros Caillou in Paris and especially welcoming the poor. Patients had to be residents of the area, and they also had to show proof that they were Catholic, usually by presenting a certificate of baptism and a confession.

Madame Necker aimed to improve patient care while maintaining the institution's financial efficiency, as detailed in the preface of the hospital's first annual report from 1780. She summarized her goals for the Hospice de Charité project thus:

To show the possibility of nursing sick people, each one in a bed to himself, with all the care dictated by the kindliest humanity, without exceeding a fixed price.

The dedication of Madame Necker and the staff to upholding a standard of good care with limited means was recognized by visitors to the hospital. John Howard, a British hospital reformer who visited in 1786, stated that the hospital was a "noble example of private charity". The detailed reports released by the hospital each year further convey Madame Necker's commitment to the project. Not only were illness and patient statistics reported, but also less obvious expenses such as the cost and quantities of food and wine consumed within the hospital.

Madame Necker emphasized hygiene, assigning particular importance to good ventilation. The Hospice de Charité's early mortality rates were somewhat better than at other hospitals, though still high. In 1780, the mortality rate was recorded at 17%, and the next year increased to 21%; by comparison, the overcrowded Hôtel-Dieu had a mortality rate of nearly 25%. Although some critics felt that the Hospice de Charité was not entirely successful in demonstrating the advantages of small hospitals, it proved to be an influential model. With fewer patients to look after and a cleaner environment, physicians were able to study patients more thoroughly and provide them with better care. Madame Necker's hospital model was employed in the development of other such hospitals, including a tiny 6-bed Montpellier hospital for Protestants that was named after her.

In 1788, Madame Necker relinquished her authority over the Hospice de Charité. In 1792, the hospital was renamed Hospice de l’Ouest or Western Hospice. Today, it is known as the Necker-Enfants Malades Hospital.

== Health problems ==
Madame Necker experienced myriad ailments throughout her life, mostly recorded through her letters to friends. In childhood, she is said to have recovered slowly from illnesses, even suffering deafness for a year after one episode. As an adult, her afflictions included endless spells of coughs, chills, and fevers, as well as vaguely described conditions that are hypothesized to have been mental illnesses. It is thought that Madame Necker's own extensive physical and emotional suffering – in addition to the suffering she witnessed in childhood as the daughter of the village pastor – contributed to her passion to improve Parisian health care.

== Later years ==
Jacques Necker fell from power in 1789 and was dismissed from the ministry. The following year, the Neckers left Paris and returned to Switzerland. Madame Necker died at Beaulieu Castle in Lausanne in 1794.
