= Joseph Omer Joly de Fleury =

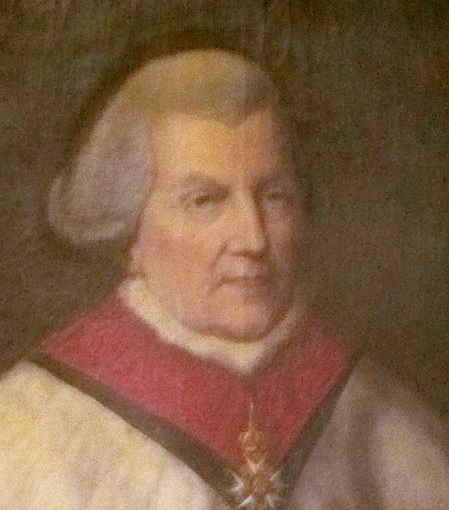
Omer Joly de Fleury

Joseph Omer Joly de Fleury (October 26, 1715 – January 29, 1810) was a member of the distinguished Joly de Fleury family, originally from Burgundy, from which came a number of leading French magistrates and officials under the ancien regime. He is notable for four principal things: his strong opposition to the philosophes and the publication of the Encyclopedie in 1759; his role in the expulsion of the Jesuits; his involvement in the Lally Tollendal Affair; and his ban on inoculation against smallpox in June 1763. In a pun on his name, Voltaire described him as ‘ni Homère, ni joli, ni fleuri' ( = neither Homer, nor pretty, nor flowery, a sarcastic comment on his apparently dreary oratory). In one of his private letters, Voltaire described him as a ‘little black balloon puffed up with stinking vapours’

== Family ==
He was the son of Guillaume-François Joly de Fleury, Procurator General of the Parlement of Paris and of Marie Francoise Le Maistre. His brothers were Guillaume-François-Louis Joly de Fleury (1710-1787) who succeeded their father in his post as Procurator General, and Jean-François Joly de Fleury (1718-1802), intendant of Dijon and Administrator General of Finances. Joseph-Omer himself was Advocate General to the Grand Conseil (1737-1746), from 1746, to the Parlement of Paris, and ultimately became président à mortier.

== Opposition to the Encyclopédie ==
On 7 February 1752, after the second volume of the Encyclopédie was published, Joly de Fleury charged in a decree presented to the Grand Conseil that "these two volumes...insert several maxims tending to destroy Royal Authority, to institute the spirit of independence and revolt, and, in obscure and ambiguous words, to erect the foundations of error, of the corruption of morals, of irreligion and unbelief". The resulting controversy was only settled when the editors agreed that all future volumes were to be reviewed by censors personally appointed by Bishop Boyer, the Dauphin's preceptor.

On 23 January 1759, following the publication of the seventh volume of the Encyclopedie, with its controversial article on Geneva, Joly de Fleury condemned it again, together with Helvetius' De l’Esprit and six other books to the Paris Parlement. His opening statement was ‘Society, the State and Religion present themselves today at the tribunal of justice… their rights have been violated, their laws disregarded. Impiety walks with head held high…. Humanity shudders, the citizenry is alarmed.’ These evils he blamed on ‘a sect of so-called Philosophers (the Philosophes)… who imagined a project… to destroy the basic truths engraved in our hearts by the hand of the Creator, to abolish his cult and his ministers, and to establish instead Materialism and Deism.’ As a result of his speech the Parlement banned the publishers of the Encyclopedie from selling any more copies, and established a commission of enquiry to look in detail at the content of the seven published volumes. In March 1759 Parlement revoked the Encyclopedie's permission to publish altogether. After this ban, work on the remaining volumes of the Encyclopedie had to continue underground. De L’Esprit and seven other publications were ordered to be lacerated and burned in front of the Palais de Justice on 10 February. In 1765 Joly de Fleury further demanded, and secured, a condemnation by Parlement of Voltaire's Dictionnaire philosophique.

== Opposition to the Jesuits ==
The Parlement of Paris and the Jesuit Order were often at odds in eighteenth-century France. In 1759 the Jesuits were expelled from Portugal and tensions in France escalated around a complex fraud which involved a number of court cases in the 1750s and early 1760s. On 6 August 1762, on the initiative of Joly de Fleury, the Parlement of Paris issued a decree depriving the Jesuits of all of their property. It required them to cease to live in their communities and to disperse. It forbade them to correspond with each other or to exercise any function. Later Joly de Fleury regretted the part he had played in the suppression of the order, whose equal, he then said, could not be found in science and learning.

== Opposition to inoculation ==
The practice of inoculation against smallpox was introduced to Paris by an Italian doctor named Gatti and by 1763 he had inoculated ninety-seven people. However, there was public consternation when some of those he had inoculated did not remain in quarantine as prescribed, and went freely around the city, potentially risking the health of others. It was said that this was the origin of the epidemic that struck Paris in late 1762 and early 1763. Joly de Fleury responded to this emergency by asking the Paris Parlement to vote to refer the question of inoculation to the Faculties of Medicine and Theology at the Sorbonne. In June 1763 the Parlement ordered that no further inoculations take place in Paris until the Faculties had rendered their judgement on the matter. Inoculations were allowed to continue outside the city, and those already inoculated were required to maintain quarantine for six weeks.

This apparently pragmatic approach quickly foundered as the physicians could not agree and published rival reports. This started a war of polemics between proponents and opponents of the practice, which effectively became a proxy for the continued struggle between the philosophes and the clerical conservatives. Joly de Fleury was the object of much mockery and abuse during these exchanges. In particular, Joly de Fleury's efforts made him the target of one of Voltaire's satirical pamphlets, or facéties. Not only did Voltaire hate him for his opposition to the philosophes, but he was also in favour of inoculation.

== The Lally Tollendal affair ==
Joly de Fleury was also involved in one of the longest-running and most acrimonious legal disputes in late eighteenth century France, the Lally-Tollendal case. Lally Tollendal was a French commander in India. Defeated by the British, he was taken as a prisoner of war to England. He was falsely accused of treason, and returned to France to clear his name. Joly de Fleury brought formal charges against him, but when his trial began in 1764, Lally Tollendal had not received any documentation of the charges, and was not allowed a defence lawyer. Throughout the trial, which lasted for two years, Lally Tollendal fought against Joly de Fleury's charges but on 6 May 1766 he was convicted and sentenced to death. On learning of his execution Voltaire began to campaign for his posthumous rehabilitation, which was obtained from Louis XVI in 1778. The case was considered to be one of the great miscarriages of justice in ancien regime France.
