= Claude Adrien Helvétius =

French philosopher (1715–1771)

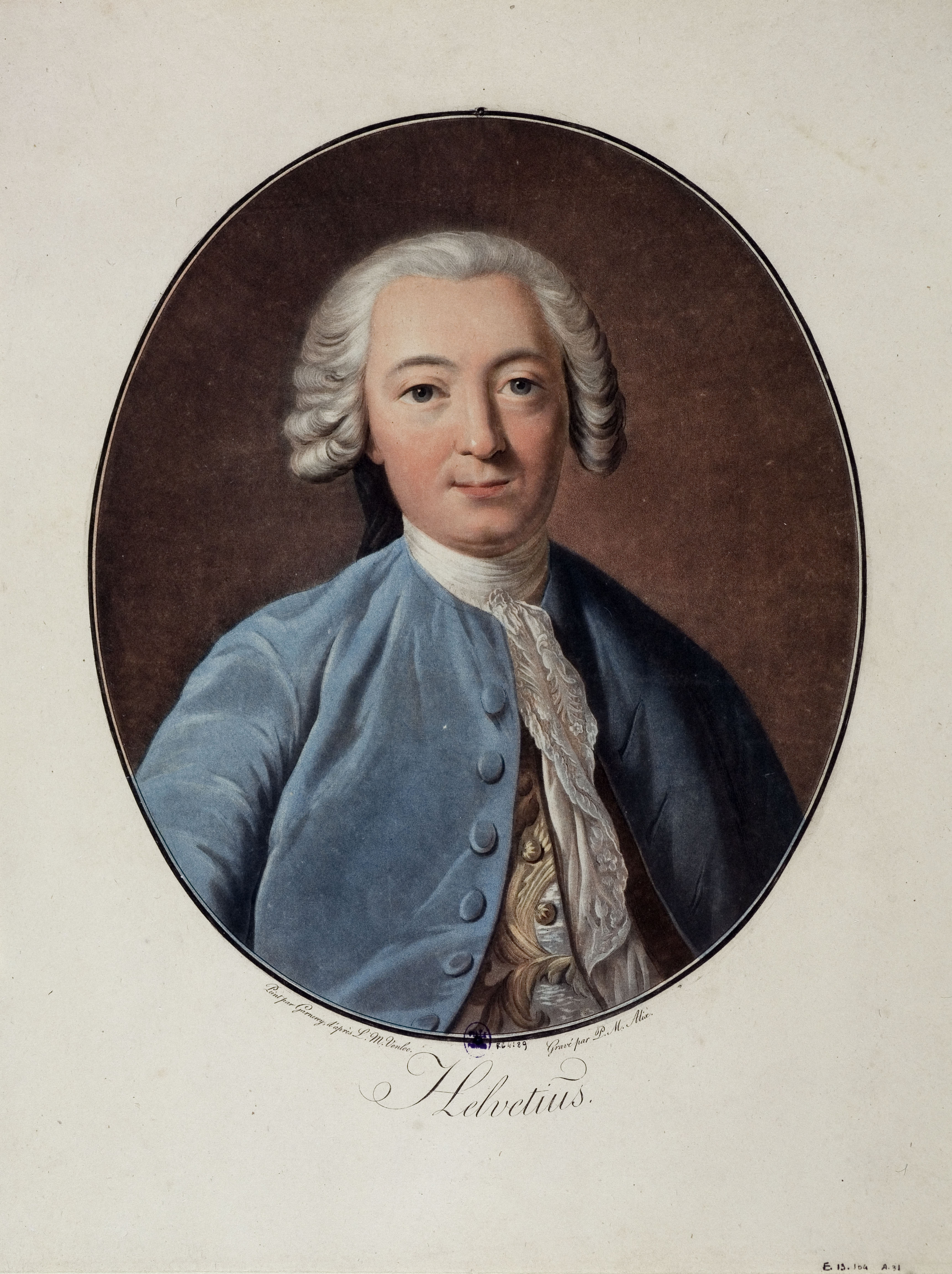
- Born: 26 January 1715; Paris, France
- Died: 26 December 1771 (aged 56); Paris, France

Philosophical work
- Era: 18th-century philosophy
- Region: Western philosophy
- School: Utilitarianism; French materialism Sensualism
- Main interests: Ethics · Political philosophy

Claude Adrien Helvétius (/hɛlˈviːʃəs/; French: [klod adʁijɛ̃ ɛlvesjys]; 26 January 1715 – 26 December 1771) was a French philosopher, Freemason, and littérateur.

== Life ==
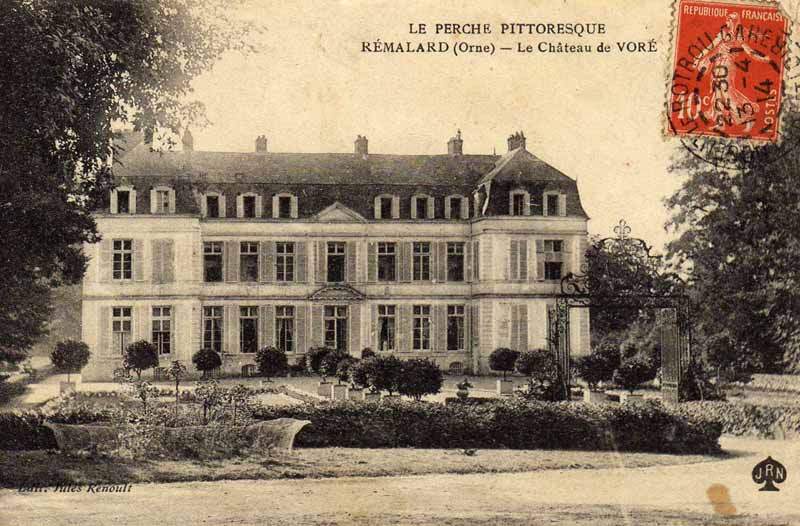
Château de Voré (Collines des Perches, Loir-et-Cher)

Claude Adrien Helvétius was born in Paris, France, and was descended from a family of physicians, originally surnamed Schweitzer (meaning "Swiss" in German; Latinized as Helvétius). His great-grandfather Johann Friedrich Schweitzer known as "Helvetius", was a Dutch physician and alchemist, of German extraction. His grandfather Adriaan Helvetius introduced the use of ipecacuanha; his father Jean Claude Adrien Helvétius was first physician to Marie Leszczyńska, queen of France. Claude Adrien was trained for a financial career, apprenticed to his maternal uncle in Caen, but he occupied his spare time with poetry. Aged twenty-three, at the queen's request, he was appointed as a farmer-general, a tax-collecting post worth 100,000 crowns a year. Thus provided for, he proceeded to enjoy life to the utmost, with the help of his wealth and liberality, his literary and artistic tastes – he attended, for example, the progressive Club de l'Entresol. As he grew older, he began to seek more lasting distinctions, stimulated by the success of Pierre Louis Maupertuis as a mathematician, of Voltaire as a poet, and of Montesquieu as a philosopher. His wife, Anne-Catherine de Ligniville, Madame Helvétius, maintained a salon attended by the leading figures of the Enlightenment for over five decades.

In 1758 Helvétius published his philosophical magnum opus, a work called De l'esprit (On Mind), which claimed that all human faculties are attributes of mere physical sensation, and that the only real motive is self-interest, therefore there is no good and evil, only competitive pleasures. Its atheistic, utilitarian and egalitarian doctrines raised a public outcry, and the Sorbonne publicly burned it in 1759, forcing Helvétius to issue several retractions.

In 1764 Helvétius visited England, and the next year, at the invitation of Frederick the Great, went to Berlin, where the king paid him much attention.

After 10 years, when he thought his fortune sufficient, he gave up the post of farmer-general, and retired to a country estate in France, where he employed his fortune in the relief of the poor, the encouragement of agriculture and the development of industries. For this he won the admiration of many of the philosophers.

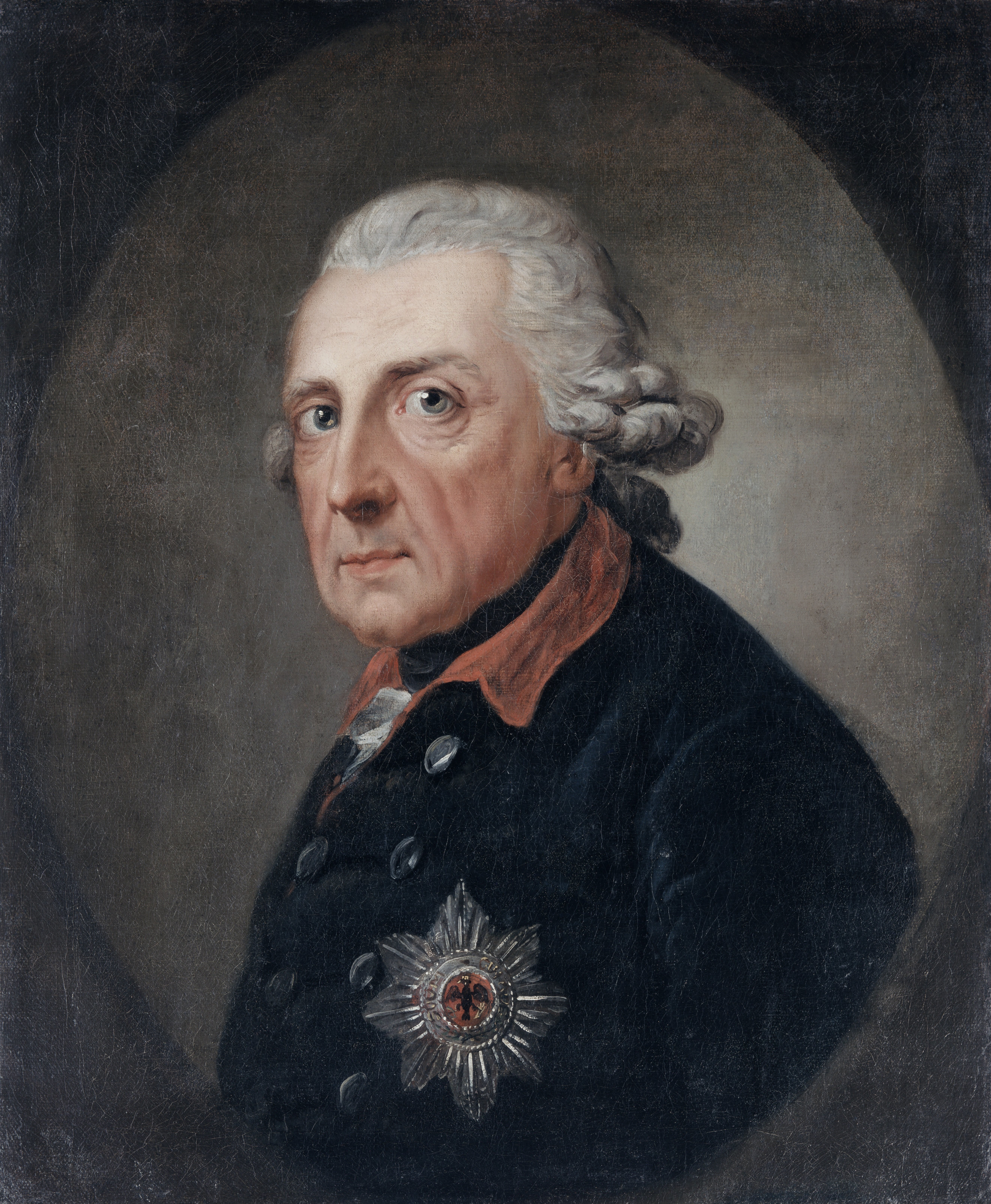
Helvétius was one of several French philosophes who spent time at the court of Frederick the Great of Prussia (depicted above)

Helvétius' family lived alternately on Château de Voré (Collines des Perches, Loir-et-Cher) and their Parisian townhouse at the rue Sainte-Anne.

Religiously, Helvétius was a Deist, albeit a "most indifferent" one.

He died in Paris on 26 December 1771.

A work found in his papers called De l'homme, de ses facultés intellectuelles et de son éducation (On Man), was published in 1773.

== Philosophy ==
=== De l'esprit and its reception ===
Helvétius' philosophical studies ended in the production of his famous book De l'esprit (On Mind). It was first published in 1758 and was intended to be the rival of Montesquieu's The Spirit of the Laws, with Helvétius arguing strongly against Montesquieu's theory that climate influenced the character of nations.

The work attracted immediate attention and aroused the most formidable opposition, especially from the Dauphin Louis, son of King Louis XV. The Advocate General Joly de Fleury condemned it in the Parlement of Paris in January 1759. The Sorbonne condemned the book, while the priests persuaded the court that it was full of the most dangerous doctrines. The book was declared to be heretical – so atheistic that it was condemned by Church and State and was burned. Helvétius, terrified at the storm he had raised, wrote three separate and humiliating retractions. In spite of his protestations of orthodoxy, the book was publicly burned by the Paris hangman.

It had far-reaching negative effects on the rest of the philosophes, in particular, Denis Diderot, and the work he was doing on the Encyclopédie. The religious authorities, particularly the Jesuits and the new Pope, began to fear the spread of atheism and wanted to clamp down on the 'modern thought' hard and quickly. De l'esprit became almost a scapegoat for this.

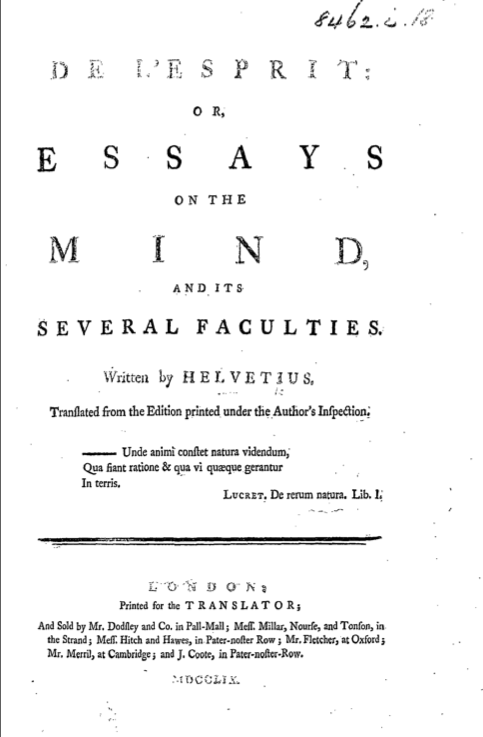
Cover page of a 1759 English translation of De l'Esprit

This great publicity resulted in the book being translated into almost all the languages of Europe. Voltaire said that it lacked originality. Rousseau declared that the very benevolence of the author gave the lie to his principles. Grimm thought that all the ideas in the book were borrowed from Diderot. Madame du Deffand felt that Helvétius had raised such a storm by saying openly what everyone thought in secret. Madame de Graffigny claimed that all the good things in the book had been picked up in her own salon.

=== Psychological egoism ===
Helvétius' philosophy belongs to the Egoist school:

1. All man's faculties may be reduced to physical sensation, even memory, comparison, judgment. Our only difference from the lower animals lies in our external organization.
2. Self-interest, founded on the love of pleasure and the fear of pain, is the sole spring of judgment, action, and affection. Human beings are motivated solely by the pursuit of pleasure and the avoidance of pain. "These two," he says, "are, and always will be, the only principles of action in man." Self-sacrifice is prompted by the fact that the sensation of pleasure outweighs the accompanying pain and is thus the result of deliberate calculation.
3. We have no freedom of choice between good and evil. There is no such thing as absolute right – ideas of justice and injustice change according to customs.

This view of man was largely Hobbesian – man is a system deterministically controllable by a suitable combination of reward and punishment, and the ends of government are to ensure the maximization of pleasure.

=== Natural equality of intelligences ===
"All men," Helvétius maintained, "have an equal disposition for understanding." As one of the French Enlightenment's many Lockean disciples, he regarded the human mind as a blank slate, but free not only from innate ideas but also from innate natural dispositions and propensities. Physiological constitution was at most a peripheral factor in men's characters or capabilities. Any apparent inequalities were independent of natural organization, and had their cause in the unequal desire for instruction. This desire springs from passions, of which all men commonly well organized are susceptible to the same degree. We thus owe everything to education. Social engineering is therefore an enterprise unconstrained by the natural abilities of men.

This natural equality applied to all men in all nations, and thus the differences in national characteristics were not the result of innate differences between the people therein, but rather a byproduct of the system of education and government. "No nation," wrote Helvétius, "has reason to regard itself superior to others by virtue of its innate endowment."

This radically egalitarian aspect of Helvétius' philosophy caused Diderot to remark that if it were true, De l'esprit might just as well have been written by Helvétius' dog keeper.

=== Omnipotence of education ===
Since all men have the same natural potential, Helvétius argued, they all have the same ability to learn. Thus, education is the method by which to reform society, and there are few limits to the drastic social improvements that could be brought about by the appropriate distribution of education. Although people seem to possess certain qualities in greater abundance than their neighbours, the explanation for this comes 'from above' – it is caused by education, law and government. "If we commonly meet in London, with knowing men, who are with much more difficulty found in France," this is because it is a country where "every citizen has a share in the management of affairs in general." "The art of forming men," he concludes, "is in all countries [...] strictly connected to the form of the government", and thus education via governmental intervention is the method of reform.

The crux of his thought was that public ethics has a utilitarian basis, and he insisted strongly on the importance of culture and education in national development. His thinking can be described as unsystematic.

=== Influence ===
The original ideas in his system are those of the natural equality of intelligences and the omnipotence of education, neither of which gained general acceptance, though both were prominent in the system of John Stuart Mill. Cesare Beccaria states that he was largely inspired by Helvétius in his attempt to modify penal laws. Helvétius also exerted some influence on the utilitarian Jeremy Bentham.

The materialistic aspects of Helvétius, along with Baron d'Holbach, had an influence on Karl Marx, the theorist of historical materialism and communism, who studied the ideas of Helvétius in Paris and later called the materialism of Helvétius and d'Holbach "the social basis of communism".

=== Criticism ===
German philosopher Johann Georg Hamann vigorously opposed Helvétius's rationalistic doctrines.

British philosopher Isaiah Berlin listed Helvétius, along with Hegel, Fichte, Rousseau, Saint-Simon and Maistre as one of the six "enemies of freedom" who constituted the ideological basis for modern authoritarianism, in his book Freedom and Betrayal: Six Enemies of Human Liberty.

== Poetry ==
His poetic ambitions resulted in the poem called Le Bonheur (published posthumously, with an account of Helvétius's life and works, by Jean François de Saint-Lambert, 1773), in which he develops the idea that true happiness is only to be found in making the interest of one person that of all.

== Bibliography ==
A work called De l'homme, de ses facultés intellectuelles et de son éducation, found among his manuscripts, was published after his death. There is a complete edition of the works of Helvétius, published at Paris, 1818.

For an estimate of his work and his place among the philosophers of the 18th century see Victor Cousin's Philosophie sensualiste (1863); PL Lezaud, Résumés philosophiques (1853); FD Maurice, in his Modern Philosophy (1862), pp. 537 seq.; J Morley, Diderot and the Encyclopaedists (London, 1878); DG Mostratos, Die Pädagogik des Helvétius (Berlin, 1891); A Guillois, Le Salon de Madame Helvétius (1894); A Piazzi, Le idee filosofiche specialmente pedagogiche de C. A. Helvétius (Milan, 1889); Georgi Plekhanov, Beiträge zur Geschichte des Materialismus (Stuttgart, 1896); L Limentani, Le teorie psicologiche de C. A. Helvétius (Verona, 1902); A Keim, Helvétius, sa vie et son œuvre (1907); Isaiah Berlin, "Helvétius" in Freedom and Its Betrayal: Six Enemies of Liberty, ed. Henry Hardy (Oxford, 2002), pp. 11–26.
