= Johann Friedrich Schweitzer =

Dutch alchemist (1630–1709)

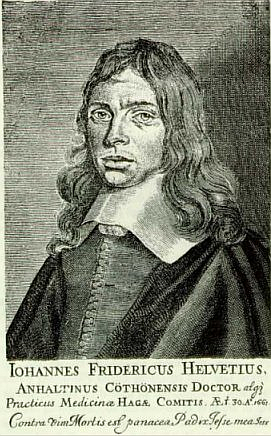
Portrait of Johann Friedrich Schweitzer

Johann Friedrich Schweitzer or Sweitzer, usually known as Helvetius (/hɛlˈviːʃəs/; January 17, 1630 – August 29, 1709), was a Dutch physician and alchemical writer of German extraction. He is known for his books Ichts aus Nichts, für alle Begierigen der Natur published in 1655, Vitulus Aureus (The Golden Calf), published in 1667 under the pseudonym Joakim Philander, and Miraculo transmutandi Metallica, Antwerp, 1667.

Helvetius was born or baptized 17 January 1630 in Köthen (Anhalt) as the son of the jurist Balthazar Sweitzer (Schweitzer, Helvety of Helvetius) and Anna Braunin. He arrived in 1649 in the Dutch Republic, where he obtained a degree at the University of Harderwijk in 1656 with a dissertation de Peste. He first lived in Amsterdam, but subsequently moved to The Hague, where he became a physician to the Prince of Orange-Nassau (later to be William III of England). He wrote numerous books on herbs and medicine in Dutch, German, and Latin.

He is notorious for the story that he actually carried out transmutation of lead into gold. He is said to have known Baruch Spinoza.

Helvetius married Johanna Pels (1643–1709) in July 1658 in The Hague. They had 16 children, including Adriaan Helvetius (1662–1727), who introduced the use of ipecac in his position at the French court and was the father of another court physician, Jean-Claude-Adrien Helvétius (1685–1755). The philosopher Claude-Adrien Helvétius (1715–1771) was a son of the latter.

Helvetius died 29 August 1709 in The Hague.
