= Assembly of Notables =

Consultative assembly in the Kingdom of France

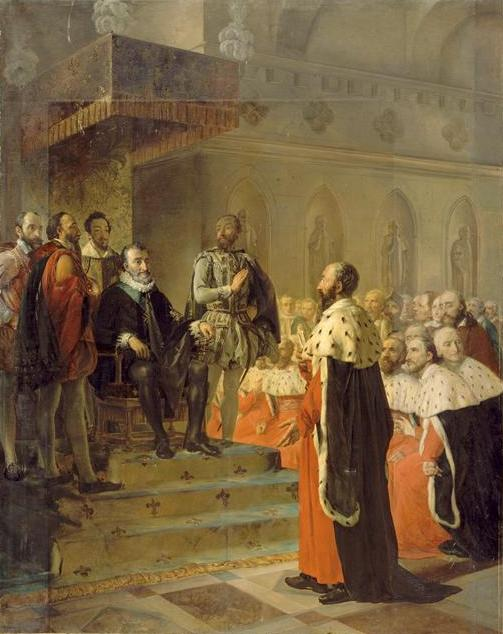
1822 depiction of the 1596 Assembly of Notables in Rouen

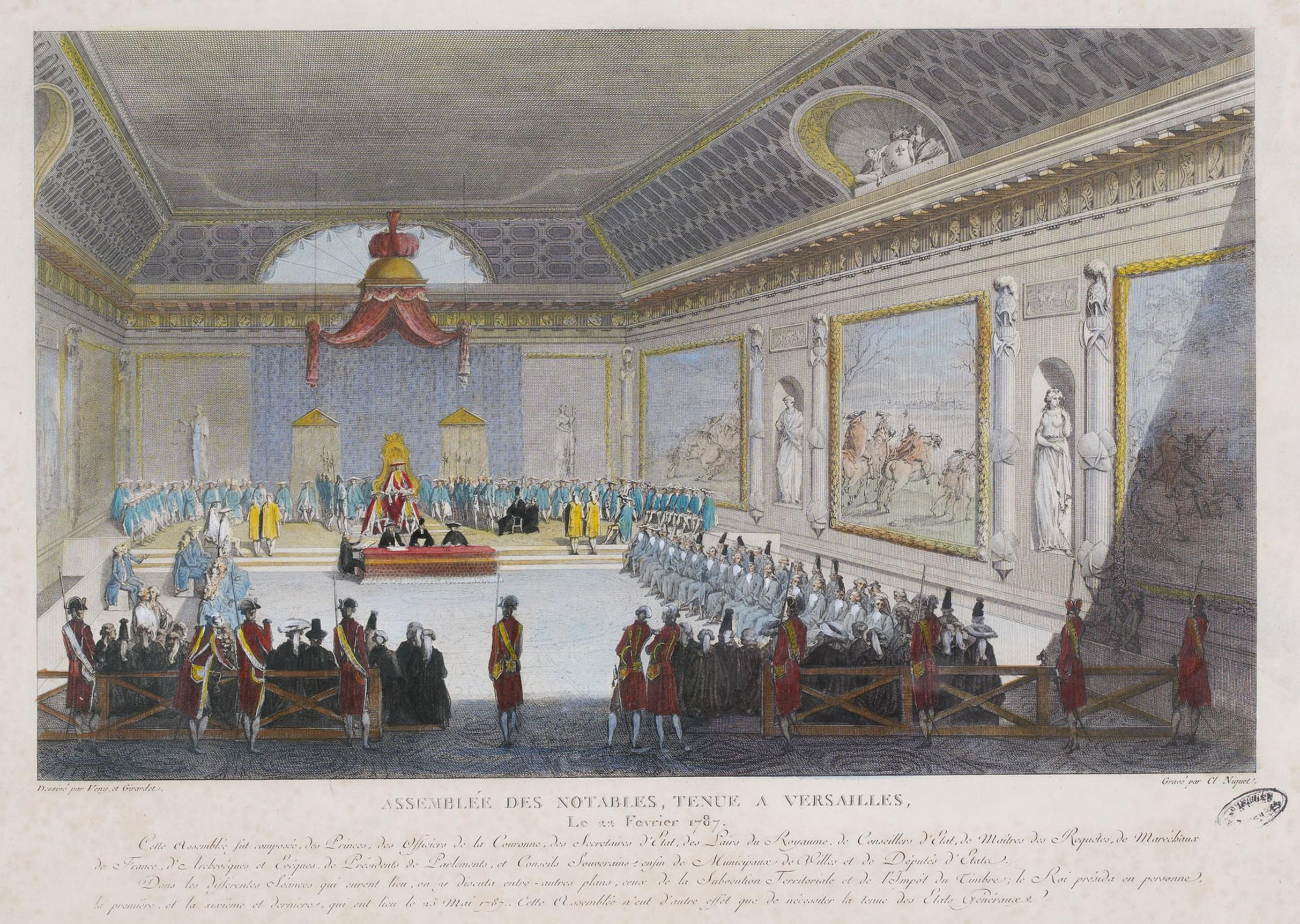
Engraving showing the Assembly of Notables of 1787 in Versailles

An Assembly of Notables (French: Assemblée des notables) was a group of high-ranking nobles, ecclesiastics, and state functionaries convened by the King of France on extraordinary occasions to consult on matters of state. Assemblymen were prominent men, usually of the aristocracy, and included royal princes, peers, archbishops, high-ranking judges, and, in some cases, major town officials. The king would issue one or more reforming edicts after hearing their advice.

This group met in 1560, 1575, 1583, 1596–97, 1617, 1626, 1787, and a final brief meeting in late 1788. Like the Estates-General, they served a consultative purpose only. But unlike the Estates-General, whose members were elected by the subjects of the realm, the assemblymen were selected by the king for their "zeal", "devotion", and their "trustworthiness" toward the sovereign.

In addition, assembly of notables can refer to an expanded version of the King's Council (Curia regis). Several times a year, whenever the king needed to cast a wider net to gather information for making important decisions or preparing edicts and ordinances, he would enlarge his Council with prominent men chosen for their social and professional standing or their skills to give counsel on the matters at hand. The role of the assembly was to advise the king on how to remedy governance issues in conflict with or brought up by the parlements or the Estates-General.

== 1560 assembly ==
In 1560, in the wake of the Conspiracy of Amboise the Lorraine-Guise government was moved towards the need to call an Assembly of Notables to address the religious problems of the kingdom that the conspiracy had laid bare and also the financial problems that had been pressuring the kingdom since the death of Henri II. All the leading nobles of the kingdom were in attendance, with the exception of the princes of Bourbon-Vendôme, the king of Navarre and the prince de Condé who were conscious that they would likely be arrested if they attended. The 40 grandees in attendance agreed to a package of reforms put forward by the Guise government, and supported the calling of an Estates General to meet at Meaux later that year. The matter of religion was also discussed, and after being taken off plan by admiral de Coligny, who proposed temporary coexistence between Catholicism and Protestantism, much to the ire of the Guise, the assembly settled on the plan proposed by the cardinal de Lorraine to call for a national religious council to address the issue, and propose reforms as necessary.

== 1575 assembly ==
During 1575, Henri III called together a number of notables for the purpose of securing subsidies.

== 1583 assembly ==
In November 1583, Henri convened an assembly of notables at Saint Germain-en-Laye to address religious demonstrations that threatened the collapse of the State. In the assembly, Cardinal de Bourbon called for France to tolerate one faith, Catholicism; he said that if this was offered, the clergy would sell their shirts to support the king. Henry, however, angrily interrupted him informing the Cardinal that any attempt to impose uniform Catholicism was unthinkable to his brother the duke of Anjou. Henri continued that he had already risked his life and estate to establish Catholicism as the sole religion, but since he had been forced to sue for peace, he would not breach it.

== 1596 assembly ==
Following the regicide of Henry III, his successor was Henry IV who learned from the experience of Henry III. He himself had called on the assembly's assistance in 1596–97 at Rouen. The assemblymen were summoned to assist in developing and authorizing new taxation plans for the country to tackle the debt. There were 95 notables present, and they recommended that the king levy a special sales tax of 5% on all sales—with the exception of wheat, to avoid bread riots. It was estimated that this pancarte would raise 5 million French pounds (livres), but in its best year it raised only 1.56 million pounds. Although the tax raised less than predicted, it did restore the royal budget to solvency. King Henry and the Duke of Sully had come up with many other possible ways to raise money, but the key to rescuing the monarchy from bankruptcy was simply to ensure that the system of taxation worked efficiently.

== 1626 assembly ==
In 1626 Louis XIII called together an assembly consisting of the government's ruling elite—13 grandees, 13 bishops, and 29 judges. Many historians have regarded this assembly, and its predecessors, as unsuccessful because they failed to enact specific reforms, but this view fails to consider the assemblies' role. The assemblies had no legislative or administrative powers; instead, they served to provide government reform proposals and to make appropriate counter-proposals. In the case of every successful assembly, the king himself would issue a major ordinance or enact significant reforms, most notably the Edict of Blois 1579, in response to the Estates-General of 1576, and the great Code Michau 1629, in response to the Assembly of Notables of 1626–27.

The king and the notables agreed on four basic changes in French government. First, they agreed that Protestant power had to be broken. There was no specific discussion of a march on La Rochelle, but the notables firmly supported the king's desire to destroy the network of independent Huguenot fortresses. Second, the notables, like those of 1596 and 1617, strongly criticized the grandees, particularly provincial governors. In 1626–27, the notables insisted in particular that the king should regain full control of the military. Third, everyone agreed that the basic administration of the kingdom lay in disarray, so that a strong statement from the central government was needed to reestablish order. In most cases, this reaffirmation of government control required only the restatement of pre-existing ordinances. Fourth, everyone agreed that the fiscal situation was catastrophic. The overwhelming majority of the assembly's deliberations focused on this last issue.

== 1787 assembly ==
The penultimate appearance of the Assembly of Notables ran from February to May of 1787, convened by Louis XVI. France's finances were in a desperate situation and the finance ministers of the day (Turgot, Necker, Calonne) all believed that tax reform was vital if France was going to pay off its debt and bring government expenditure back into line with government income, which they viewed as necessary. However, before any new tax laws could be passed, they first had to be registered with the French parlements (which were high courts, not legislatures, but that possessed a limited veto power on new laws).

Repeated attempts to implement tax reform failed due to lack of parlement support, as parlement judges felt that any increase in tax would have a direct negative effect on their own income. In response to this opposition, the finance minister at the time, Calonne, suggested that Louis XVI call an Assembly of Notables. While the Assembly of Notables had no legislative power in its own right, Calonne hoped that if the Assembly of Notables could be made to support the proposed reforms then this would apply pressure on parlement to register them.

Calonne proposed four major reforms:

1. a single land-value tax
2. the conversion of the corvée into a money tax
3. the abolition of internal tariffs
4. the creation of elected provincial assemblies

In the traditional view, the plan failed because the 144 assemblymen, who included princes of the blood, archbishops, noblemen and other people from the traditional elite, did not wish to bear the burden of increased taxation.

However, Simon Schama has argued that the notables in fact were quite open to radical political changes; for example, some proposed the elimination of all the tax exemptions conferred by noble status; others proposed lowering the income qualifications for voting for members of the proposed provincial assemblies. Schama wrote:

Yet what was truly astonishing about the debates of the Assembly is that they were marked by a conspicuous acceptance of principles like fiscal equality that even a few years before would have been unthinkable… Where disagreement occurred, it was not because Calonne had shocked the Notables with his announcement of a new fiscal and political world; it was either because he had not gone far enough or because they disliked the operational methods built into the program.

With the Assembly being uncooperative Calonne decided to instead appeal straight to the people and put pressure on the Notables with a pamphlet including a foreword titled Avertissement, or "The Warning," in which he depicted the members of the Assembly as simply trying to defend their privileges at the expense of the people. However this did not rally the people or bring the Notables in line. Instead this angered the Notables as now they saw Calonne trying to subvert their power. In response to this perceived over reach by Calonne multiple members of the Assembly formed a plot to see Calonne removed from his position. To do this though they needed to convince Louis XVI himself to get rid of Calonne. With one of the members to play a crucial role in this plot being Marie Antoinette, who with other members would sow distrust of Calonne to the King until on 8 April 1787 Calonne would be dismissed from his role by the King.

Following the removal of Calonne two more people would lead the Assembly until its end. Those being Bouvard de Fourqueux who lead the assembly from 9 April to 1 May 1787, then Loménie de Brienne who would lead from 1 May to 25 May. During this period of the Assembly the Notables would seek to impose greater checks upon the Kings power, and would see many claim the Assembly did not have the authority to implement reform and that only the Estates-General had such power. While the king sought to take power and privileges from the Notables. This would create a stalemate within the body that bred discontent and a desire to see the Assembly end from both sides. So with the desire to continue the Assembly waning it would be dissolved on 25 May.

In addition to tax reform, the Assembly also discussed other issues. The result was that the Assembly assisted the Parlement in creating provincial assemblies, reestablished free trade in grain, converted the corvée (a feudal duty in the form of forced labour) into a cash payment, and generated short-term loans.

After the 1787 meeting of the Assembly, a final meeting was convened from early November to mid-December 1788 with a mandate to determine the composition and voting procedures of the meeting of the Estates General. This would be the final convention of the Assembly of Notables, which adjourned sine die.

== See also ==
- An Assembly of Jewish Notables which convened the Grand Sanhedrin in 1807, as decreed by Napoleon in 1806.
