= Beaulieu Castle =

Castle in Lausanne, Switzerland

- Château de Beaulieu
- Lausanne in Switzerland
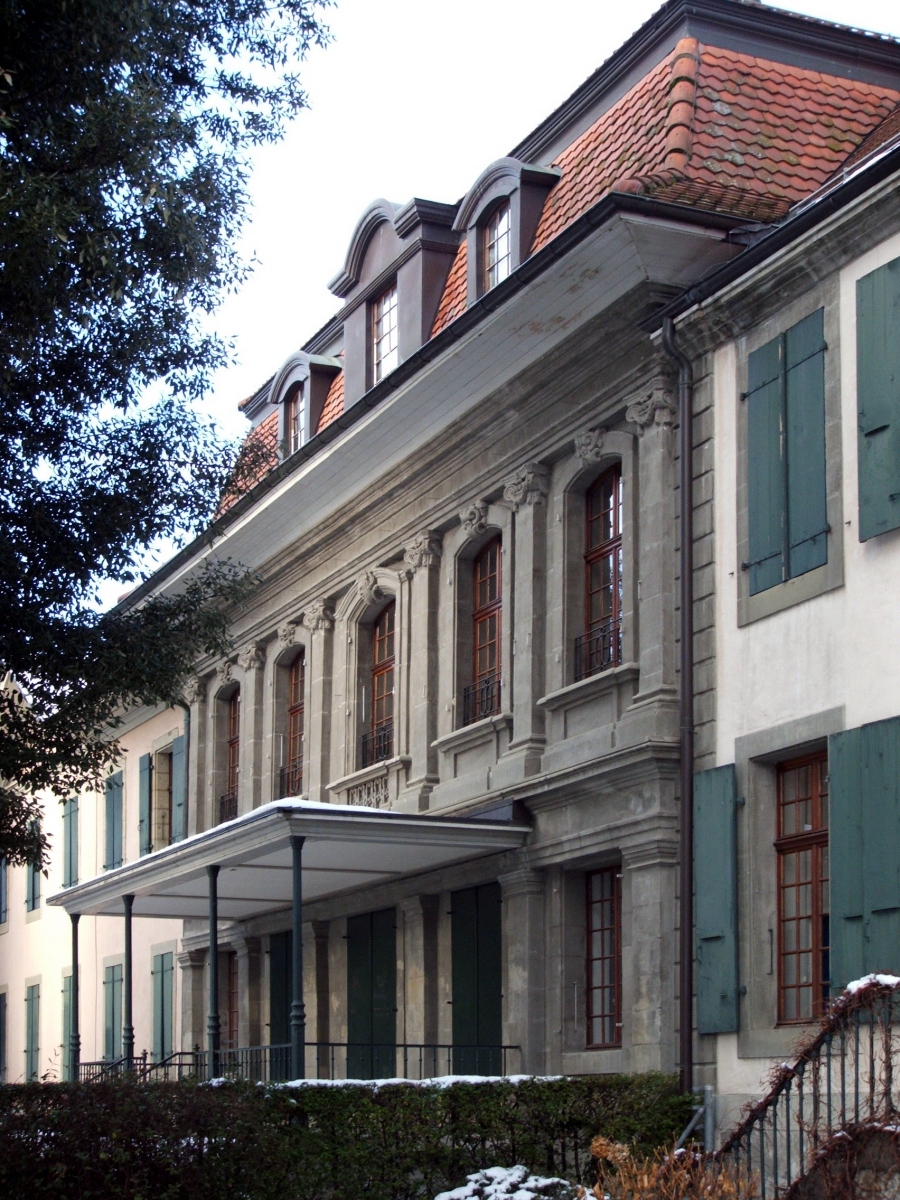
- Exterior of Beaulieu

Site information
- Type: Château
- Condition: Museum

Location
- Coordinates: 46°31′38″N 6°37′30″E

Site history
- Built by: Rodolphe de Crousaz

Swiss Cultural Property of National Significance

Beaulieu Castle (French: Château de Beaulieu) is a château in the municipality of Lausanne of the Canton of Vaud in Switzerland. It is a Swiss heritage site of national significance.

== See also ==
- List of castles in Switzerland
- Château
