= Charles Alexandre de Calonne =

French statesman (1734–1802)

Charles Alexandre de Calonne Count of Hannonville
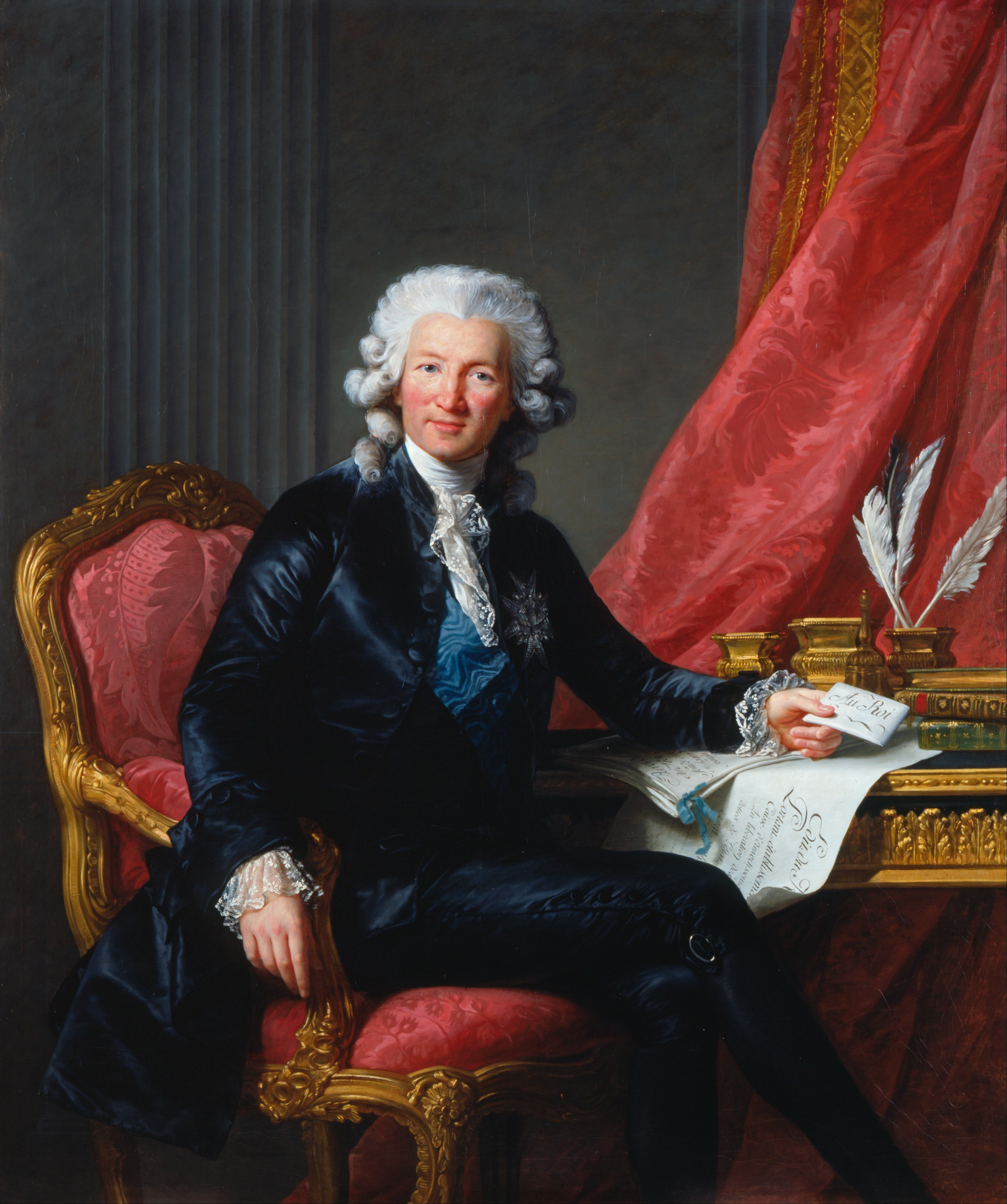
- Portrait of Charles Alexandre de Calonne by Élisabeth-Louise Vigée-Le Brun (1784, Royal Collection)

Controller-General of Finances
- In office 3 November 1783 – 17 May 1787
- Monarch: Louis XVI
- Preceded by: Henri Lefèvre d'Ormesson
- Succeeded by: Michel Bouvard de Fourqueux

Personal details
- Born: 20 January 1734 Douai, French Flanders and Hainaut, Kingdom of France
- Died: 30 October 1802 (aged 68) Paris, Seine, French Republic
- Spouses: Marie Joséphine Marquet (m. 1766; died 1770) Anne-Rose de Nettine (m. 1788–1802)
- Children: 1
- Education: University of Paris
- Occupation: Statesman; parliamentarian

Charles Alexandre de Calonne (20 January 1734 – 30 October 1802), titled Count of Hannonville in 1759, was a French statesman, best known for being Louis XVI's Controller-General of Finances (minister of finance) in the years leading up to the French Revolution.

Calonne attempted repeatedly to pass reforms that lowered government spending and implemented property added value tax among other things, but failed due to popular opposition to his policies. Realizing that the Parlement of Paris would never agree to reform, Calonne handpicked an Assembly of Notables in 1787 to approve new taxes. When they refused, Calonne's reputation plummeted and he was forced to leave the country.

== Origins and rise to prominence ==
Born on 20 January 1734 in Douai into an upper-class family, he entered the legal profession and became a lawyer to the general council of Artois, procureur to the parlement of Douai, Master of Requests (France), intendant of Metz (1768) and of Lille (1774). He seems to have been a man with notable business abilities and an entrepreneurial spirit, while generally unscrupulous in his political actions. In the terrible crisis preceding the French Revolution, when successive ministers tried in vain to replenish the exhausted royal treasury, Calonne was summoned as Controller-General of Finances, an office he assumed on 3 November 1783.

He owed the position to the Comte de Vergennes, who for over three years continued to support him. According to the Habsburg ambassador, Florimond Claude, Comte de Mercy-Argenteau, his public image was extremely poor. Calonne immediately set about remedying the fiscal crisis, and he found in Louis XVI enough support to create a vast and ambitious plan of revenue-raising and administrative centralization. Calonne focused on maintaining public confidence through building projects and spending, which was mainly designed to maintain the Crown's capacity to borrow funds. He presented the king with his plan on 20 August 1786. At its heart was a new land value tax that would replace the old vingtième taxes and finally sweep away the fiscal exemptions of the privileged orders. The new tax would be administered by a system of provincial assemblies elected by the local property owners at parish, district and provincial levels. This central proposal was accompanied by other reforms meant to further rationalize the French economy, a package that included free trade in grain and abolition of France's myriad internal customs barriers. It was in effect one of the most, if not the most, comprehensive attempts at enlightened reform during the reign of King Louis XVI.

== Measures ==
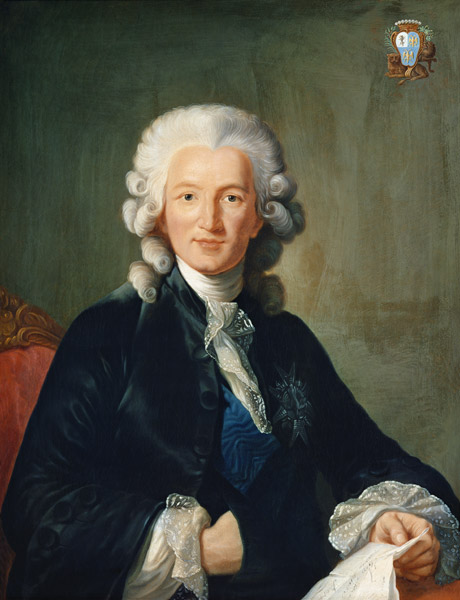
Charles Alexandre de Calonne, Count of Hannonville by Johann Ernst Heinsius

After taking office, he discovered the nation had debts of 110 million livres (partly incurred by France's involvement in the American Revolution) and no means of paying them. At first he tried to get credit and support the government with loans so as to maintain public confidence in its solvency. In October 1785 he reissued gold coinage and developed the Caisse d'Escompte (dealing in cash discounts). Knowing the Parlement of Paris would veto a single land tax that all landowners would have to pay, Calonne persuaded Louis XVI to call an assembly of notables to vote on his referendum. Calonne's eventual reform package, which was introduced to the Assembly of Notables to impose them, consisted of five major points:

1. Cut government spending
2. Revive free trade methods
3. Authorize the sale of Church property
4. Equalize salt and tobacco taxes
5. Establish a universal land value tax

All these measures failed because of the powerlessness of the crown to impose them.

As a last resort, Calonne proposed that the king abolish internal customs duties and implement a property tax on nobles and clergy. Anne Robert Jacques Turgot, Baron de Laune, a noted Swiss economist and Jacques Necker, an eminent French banker and former Director-General of Finances, had tried and failed to get these reforms adopted. Calonne attributed their failure to the opposition of the parlements, so he called another Assemblée des notables in February 1787. After he made a presentation to the assembly on the French deficit and its causes and dangers as he saw them, Calonne proposed the establishment of a subvention territoriale, which would be levied on all property without distinction.

== Conflict with the Assembly of Notables of Versailles ==
This suppression of privileges was badly received. Calonne's spendthrift and authoritarian reputation was well known to the parlements, earning him their enmity. Knowing this, he intentionally submitted his reform programme directly to the king and the hand-picked assembly of notables, not to the sovereign courts or parlements, first. Composed of the old regime's social and political elite, however, the assembly of notables balked at the deficit presented to them when they met at Versailles in February 1787, and despite Calonne's plan for reform and his backing from the king, they suspected that the controller-general was in some way responsible for the enormous financial strains. Protests against Calonne erupted, supported by the middle and lower-middle classes, who burnt effigies of Calonne in support of the notable assembly's resistance to tax. On September 14, 1788, after Guillaume-Chrétien de Lamoignon de Malesherbes retired, there were riots in Paris on Rue Mélée and the Rue de Grenelle, where more figures of Calonne were burned, along with those of Breteuil and the Duchess de Polignac.

Calonne, angered, printed his reports and so alienated the court. Louis XVI dismissed him on 8 April 1787 and exiled him to Lorraine. The joy was general in Paris, where Calonne, accused of wishing to raise taxes, was known as Monsieur Déficit.

== Dismissal and exile ==
Calonne soon afterwards left for Great Britain, and during his residence there kept up a polemical correspondence with Necker. After being dismissed, Calonne stated, "The King, who assured me a hundred times that he would support me with unshakable firmness, abandoned me, and I succumbed”. He was replaced by Loménie de Brienne, who similarly fared poorly in the political environment.

In 1789, when the Estates-General were about to assemble, he crossed to Flanders in the hope of offering himself for election, but he was forbidden to enter France. In revenge he joined the émigré group at Coblenz, wrote in their favour, and spent nearly all the fortune brought him by his wife, a wealthy widow. He was present with the Count of Artois, the reactionary brother of Louis XVI, at Pillnitz in August 1791 at the time of the issuance of the Declaration of Pillnitz, an attempt to intimidate the revolutionary government of France that the Count of Artois had pressed for. In 1802, having again settled in London, he received permission from Napoleon Bonaparte to return to France. He died about a month after his arrival in his native country.

== Legacy ==
Calonne's negative reputation and assumed responsibility for France's financial crisis in the years leading to the Revolution of 1789 have been judged unfair by historians such as Munro Price. During his position as controller-general, he had genuinely tried to make amends for his previous spendthrift policies. As a contemporary writer, Nicolas Chamfort, remarked, Calonne was "applauded when he lit the fire, and condemned when he sounded the alarm." However, economic historians such as Eugene White have stressed the negative role played by Calonne, who continued the restoration of a venal system of financial administration.

His fall had important significance to the fate of the monarchy in France before 1789. The financial strains made apparent through Calonne's attempts at reform revealed the instability of the monarchy as a whole, which up until then had been managed on the basis of traditional monarchical absolutism: secretly, hierarchically, without public scrutiny of accounts or consent to taxation. For centuries, the monarchy had controlled fiscal policy on its own terms, and when knowledge of an unmanageable and growing deficit became more widely known, the image was of a failed and, in many ways, corrupt institution. Louis XVI, who had backed Calonne's reform programme wholeheartedly, saw its refusal by the notables and the parliament as a personal failure. Conscientious in his attempts to alleviate the suffering of the French people, the king, it is clear, genuinely hoped to implement an enlightened policy with the help of Calonne. Crushed by this opposition to Calonne's project, the king withdrew to long hours of hunting and larger meals. Many historians see the ensuing months as the beginning of the king's bouts of depression.

== Bibliography ==
- 1787 - Procès de M. de Calonne, ou Réplique à son libelle
- 1788 Motif de M. de Calonne, pour différer jusqu'à l'assemblée des États-Généraux, la réfutation du nouvel écrit que M. Necker vient de publiér sur l'objet de leur controverse
- 1788 - Réponse à l'écrit de M. Necker, publié en avril 1787, contenant l'examen des comptes de la situation des finances rendus en 1774, 1776, 1781, 1783 & 1787, avec des observations sur les résultats de l'Assemblée des notables. Londres: Impr. de T. Spilsbury
- 1790 - De l'état de la France, présent et a venir
- 1796 - Tableau de l'Europe, jusqu'au commencement de 1796; et pensées sur ce qui peut procurer promptement une paix solide. Suivi d'un appendix sur plusieurs questions importantes

== Literature ==
- 1963 - Robert Lacour-Gayet. Calonne. Financier, réformateur, contre-révolutionnaire, 1734-1802. Paris: Hachette
