= Albert Jean Michel de Rocca =

French military officer (1788–1818)

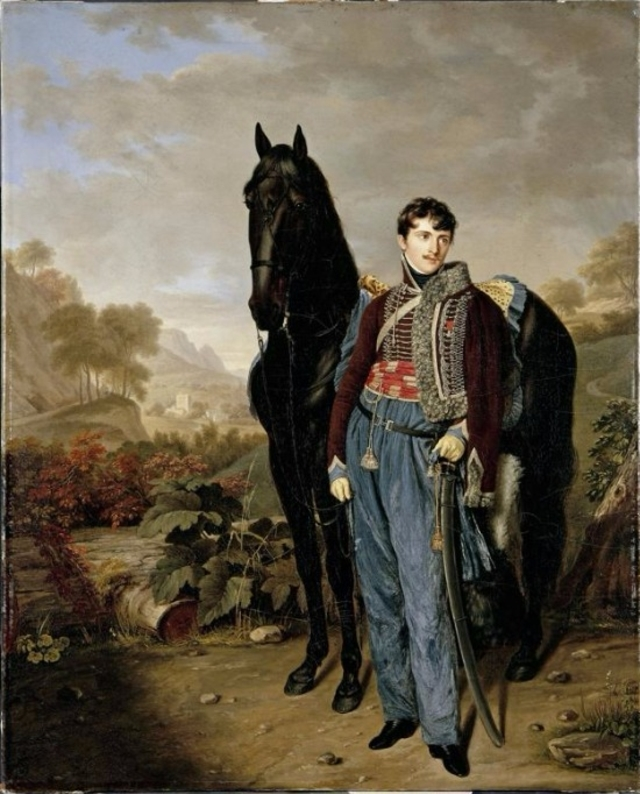
- Born: 1788; Geneva, Republic of Geneva
- Died: 31 January 1818 (aged 29–30)
- Occupation: French lieutenant during the Napoleonic Wars
- Spouse: Anne Louise Germaine de Staël (m. 1812; died 1817)

Albert Jean Michel de Rocca (1788 – 31 January 1818) was a French lieutenant during the Napoleonic Wars. He was also the second husband of Anne Louise Germaine de Staël.

== Biography ==
De Rocca was born in Geneva, Republic of Geneva, in 1788. He served in the French army during the Peninsular War and was seriously injured. After returning to Geneva, he had an affair with Germaine de Staël, who, exiled from Paris by Napoleon, lived in her castle at nearby Coppet. The lady bore a son on 7 April 1812, whose father legitimated as Louis-Alphonse Rocca. They separated when Madame de Staël started on a European tour, to reach London through Vienna, Moscow, St. Petersburg and Stockholm. Later they married and moved together to Paris after Waterloo and Napoleon's second abdication. On 5 January 1817 Germaine de Staël suffered a seizure which left her paralysed. De Staël subsequently died on 14 July 1817, soon followed by de Rocca, who died in Hyères on 31 January 1818.

De Rocca left two descriptions of the military events in which he was involved: "Mémoire sur la guerre des Français en Espagne" and "La campagne de Walcheren et d'Anvers" (a failed landing by the British in Kingdom of Holland and Belgium)". His portrait as Hussard de Chamborant, with his horse "Sultan", an oil on cloth by Pierre-Louis Bouvier, still decorates Madame de Staël's bedroom in Coppet.

His son Louis-Alphonse married Marie Louise Barthelot de Rambuteau, daughter of Claude-Philibert Barthelot, comte de Rambuteau.

== Sources ==
- André Palluel-Guillard, L'aigle et la croix : Genève et la Savoie, 1798-1815, Yens-sur-Morges, Éditions Cabedita, 1999, 662 pages, p. 618 [archive] (ISBN 2-88295-260-0).
- J. Christopher Herold, Mistress to an Age : A Life of Madame de Stael, Grove Press, 2002, 512 pages (ISBN 0-8021-3837-3).
- Pauline Laure Marie de Broglie Pange, Le dernier amour de Madame de Staël d'après des documents inédits, Genève, La Palatine, 1944, 255 pages, p. 159.
