= Delphine (novel) =

1802 novel by Germaine de Staël

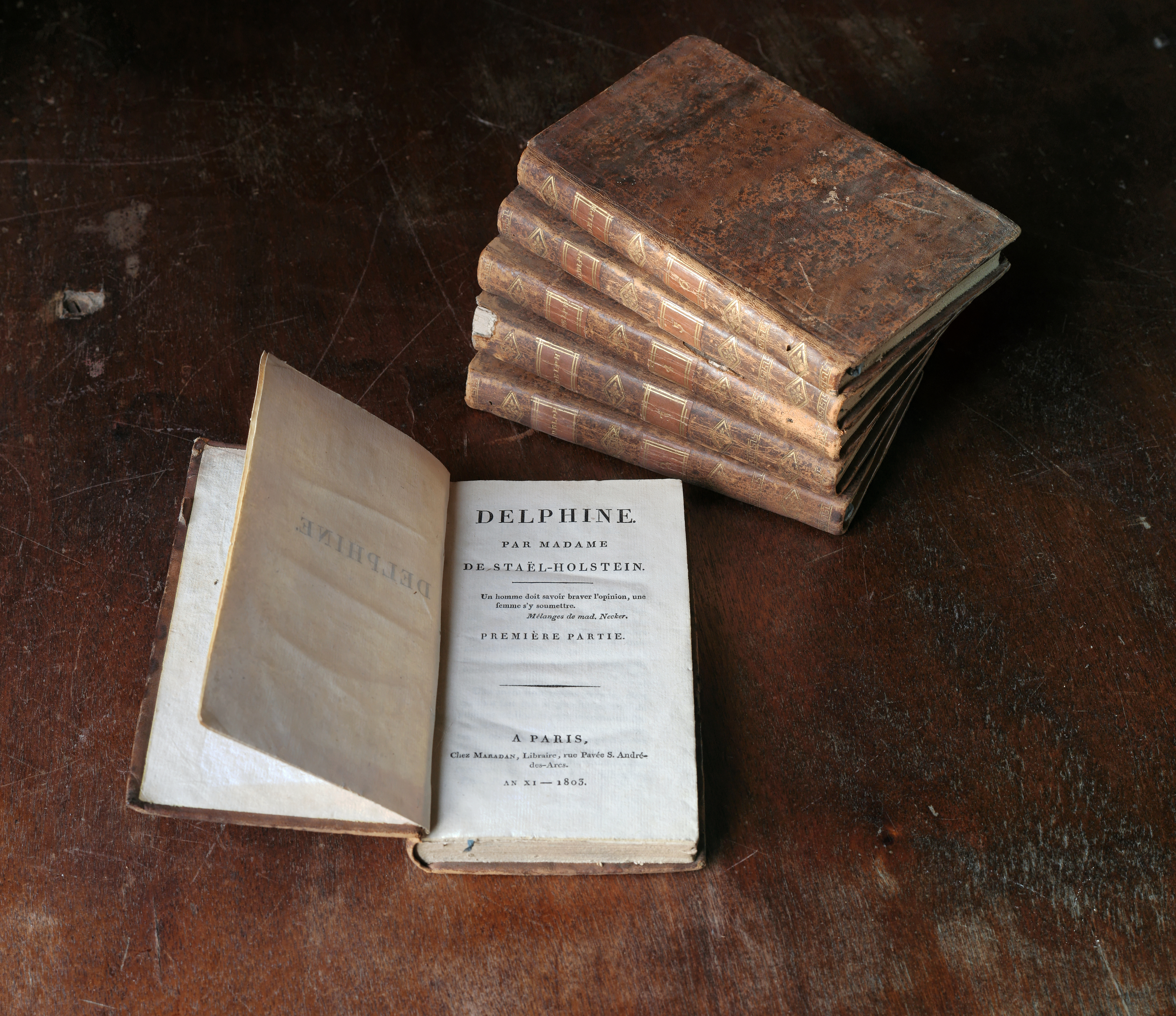
- 1803 edition
- Author: Germaine de Staël
- Language: French
- Genre: Epistolary novel
- Publication date: 1802
- Publication place: France

Delphine is the first novel by Germaine de Staël, published in 1802. The book is written in epistolary form (as a series of letters) and examines the limits of women's freedom in an aristocratic society. Although de Staël denied political intent, the book was controversial enough for Napoleon to exile the author.

In this tragic novel, influenced by Johann Wolfgang von Goethe's The Sorrows of Young Werther and Jean-Jacques Rousseau's Julie, or the New Heloise, she reflects on the discussions on divorce in the National Assembly before the Concordat of 1801, when the laws were changed; the consequences after the Battle of Verdun (1792) leading to arrests and the September Massacres, the fate of the émigrés. The main characters have traits of Benjamin Constant and Talleyrand, and the liberalist view of the Italian politician Melzi d'Eril.

== Creation ==
In a literary and political essay called De la littérature dans ses rapports avec les institutions sociales published in 1800, Germaine de Staël wrote about the history of literature and its links with political contexts, and also advocated the ideas of the Age of Enlightenment, which did not please Napoleon. The emperor of the French was also afraid of de Staël's political relations, and suspected her to be an opponent. Delphine's publication in 1802 made things even worse: de Staël was exiled from Paris, and forbidden to get closer than 40 lieues from the city.

When publishing Delphine, she claimed she was not interested in politics any more. Yet, this novel dedicated to "the silent France" (la France silencieuse) explicitly talks about such political and sociological subjects such as women's status, Protestantism, political liberalism, and emigration.

== Summary ==
The story takes place in Paris between 1789 and 1792 during the French Revolution. Delphine d'Albémar, a young widow, arranges a wedding between one of her distant relatives, Matilde de Vernon, and Léonce de Mondoville. But she falls in love with Léonce, and as he is engaged with Matilde, their love is impossible. The story ends tragically with Delphine committing suicide.

== Main characters ==
- Delphine d'Albémar, the heroine, who gives her name to the novel. Formerly married to M. d'Albémar, she is now a widow; she is rich, generous and smart and wishes to make her friends happy. This is why she arranges the wedding of Matilde de Vernon and Léonce de Mondoville. She claims that the duty to do what is right is more important to her than the judgement of others on her doings, but when she falls in love with Léonce, she gets torn between the two, and ends up killing herself.
- Matilde de Vernon, a distant cousin and friend of Delphine. She is quite the opposite of Delphine, being discreet, bigot, but deeply in love with Léonce though she doesn't show it at first.
- Madame de Vernon, Matilde's mother, a pleasant-looking woman, but who is actually sly and acts for her own interest only. However, her character can be explained by her loveless marriage with M. de Vernon.
