= Claude-Philibert Barthelot de Rambuteau =

French administrator (1781–1869)

Claude-Philibert Barthelot comte de Rambuteau
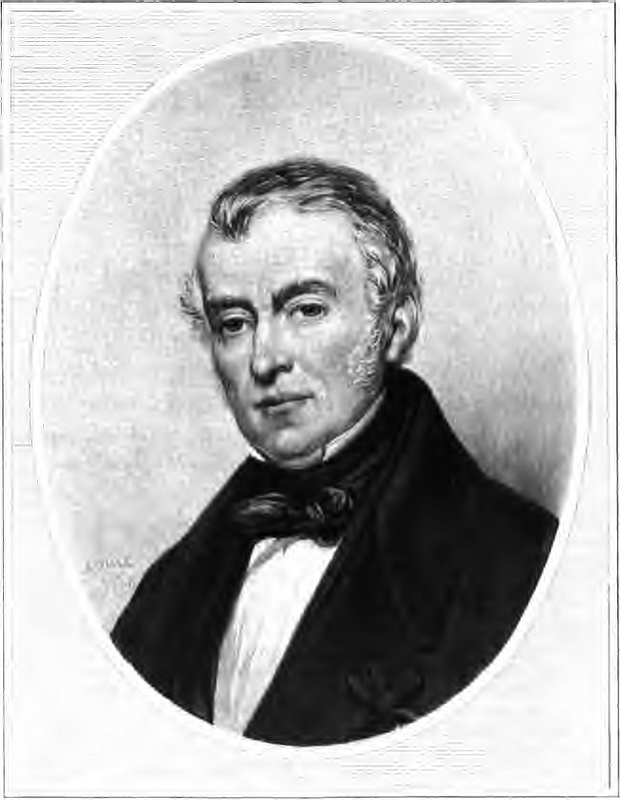
- Comte de Rambuteau (1838)
- Born: 9 November 1781; Mâcon, Saône-et-Loire, France
- Died: 11 April 1869 (aged 87); France
- Occupation: Administrator
- Spouse: Marie Adélaide Charlotte de Narbonne-Lara (m. 1808; died 1856)
- Children: 2

Claude-Philibert Barthelot, comte de Rambuteau (French pronunciation: [klod filibɛːʁ baʁtəlo kɔ̃t də ʁɑ̃byto]) (Mâcon, 9 November 1781 – Château de Rambuteau, 11 April 1869) was a French senior official of the first half of the 19th century. He was préfet of the former Department of the Seine, which included Paris, from 1833 to 1848. He established the groundwork for the fundamental transformation of Paris that Haussmann carried out under the Second Empire.

== Career ==
His administration was marked by the implementation of hygienists’ theories. One year before his nomination, a cholera epidemic devastated Paris. Rambuteau thought that the narrow, tortuous streets and small disease-prone districts in the centre of Paris encouraged the development of the disease. He commenced the cutting of 13-metre-wide roads through Paris with the widening of the Rue Rambuteau in 1839, which was later named after him. This was the first time wide roads had been built in central Paris.

Under his administration, the Arc de Triomphe in the Place de l'Étoile was finished, and the building of the great avenue of the Champs-Élysées commenced.

Rambuteau’s motto was "Water, air, shade". He modernised the Paris sewers and ordered the construction of many fountains. Some of his fountains in Paris parks still function. He developed gas lighting and the planting of trees along avenues. At the beginning of his administration, the city had 69 gas jets; at his departure it had 8,600 gas jets. He also commenced the construction of the famous pissoirs (public urinals, popularly known as "Rambuteau columns") along Paris roads.

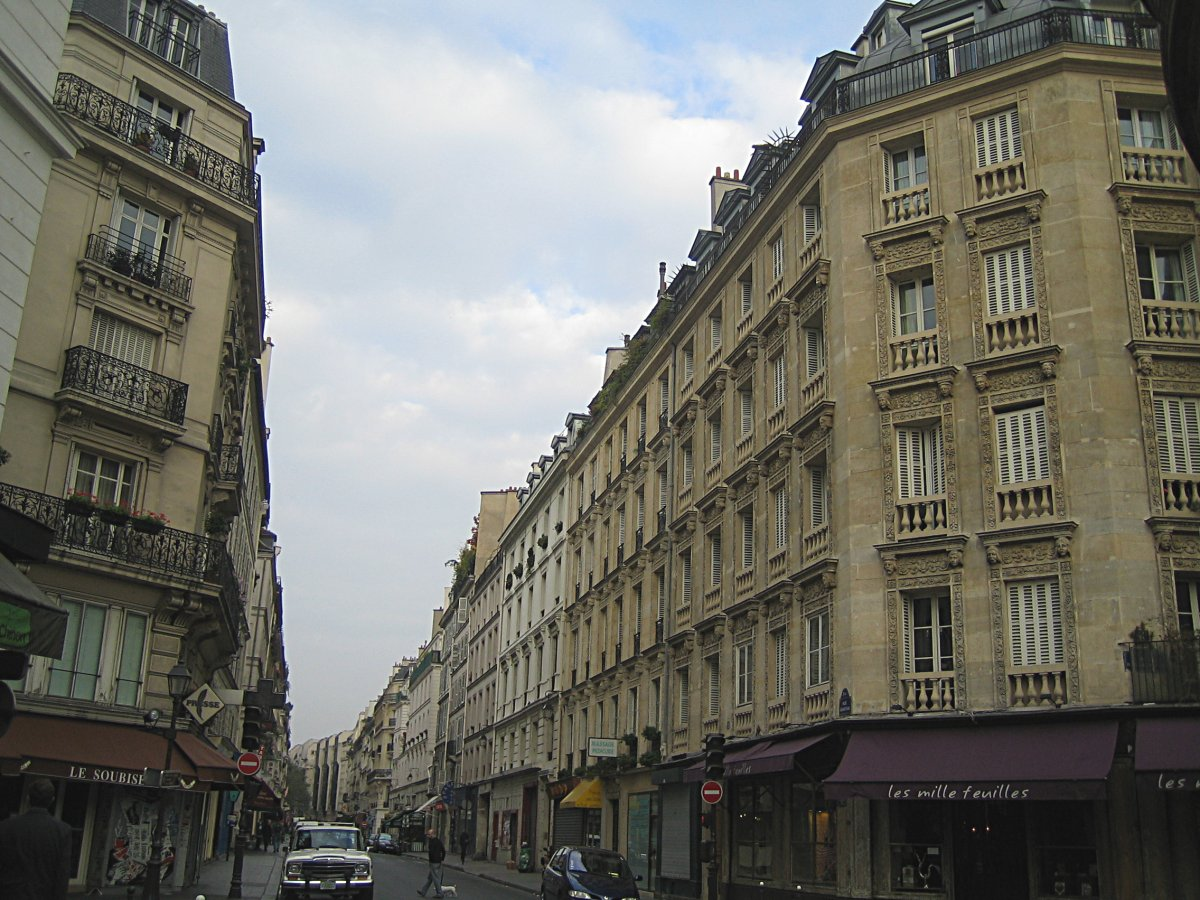
Rue Rambuteau

In spite of the enactment of the law of expropriation in the public interest in 1841, Rambuteau did not have the means or the ambition to implement the work that Haussmann later carried out, but he showed the way forward.

== Personal life ==
On 7 March 1808 at Agen, he married Marie Adélaide Charlotte de Narbonne-Lara (Belleville, 11 May 1790 - Champgrenon, 31 May 1856), second daughter of Louis Marie de Narbonne-Lara, and Marie Adélaïde de Montholon. Rambuteau and his wife had two daughters:

- Amable Françoise Barthelot de Rambuteau. In Paris on 16 July 1835, she married Jean Jacques Louis Lombard de Buffières (Lyon, 15 July 1800 - Lyon, 26 July 1875), son of Claude, Baron Lombard de Buffières, and Monique Rast de Maupas, and had four sons, who used the name Lombard de Buffières de Rambuteau.
- Marie Louise Barthelot de Rambuteau (1812 - 7 September 1880) married Théodore Gilles Louis Alphonse de Rocca (17 April 1812 - 12 November 1842) without issue. De Rocca was the son of Madame de Staël and Albert de Rocca.

== Sources ==
- Domingos de Araújo Afonso et alii, Le Sang de Louis XIV (Braga, 1961), Tome I, p. 276.
