= Pierre-Louis Bouvier =

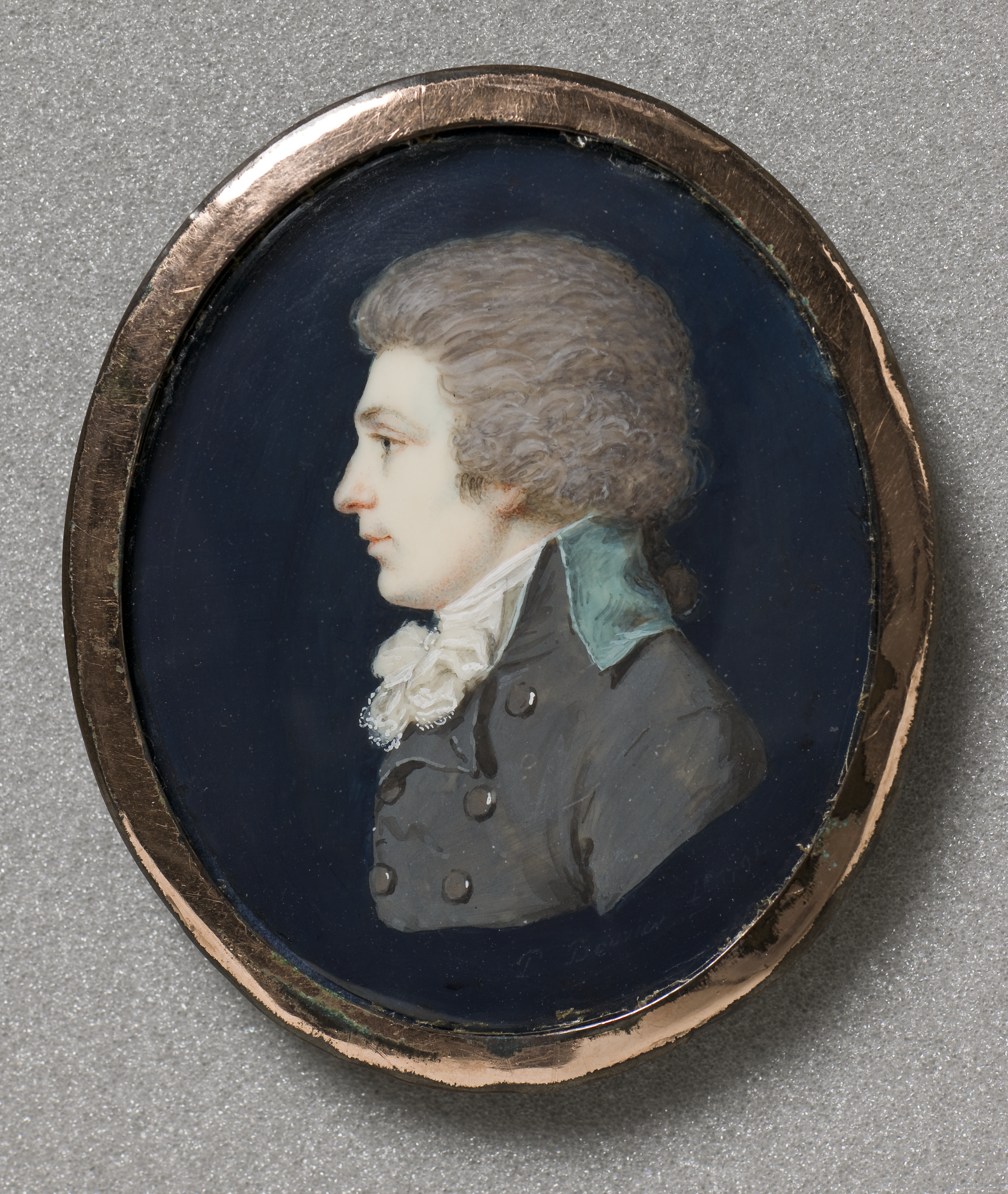
Self-portrait, Nationalmuseum, Stockholm.

Pierre-Louis Bouvier (23 August 1765 - 27 November 1836) was a Swiss artist known for his drawings, miniature paintings and portraits. He was also a notable teacher, wrote a handbook on oil painting in 1827, and invented and built a pigment-grinding machine (recognised in 1829 by the Institut de France).

== Life ==
He was born in Geneva and aged thirteen began his studies at the public drawing school in that city. He then became an apprentice of Louis-André Fabre, an artist in enamels, and studied for three years at Paris's Academy of Fine Arts and in the studio of miniaturist Antoine Vestier.

He returned to Geneva in 1788, where he produced miniatures in watercolour and gouache on ivory. The following year he exhibited his first two portraits at the city's salon and in 1790 he married Marie Isaline Fé, daughter of an engraver and enamel artist. The couple had two sons and two daughters.

With the annexation by France of the Republic of Geneva imminent, Bouvier emigrated in 1797 to Hamburg, where he could work undisturbed. He only returned to Geneva in 1801 and made frequent visits to Paris, exhibiting at the latter's salon in 1804. He began receiving commissions from Napoleon I's court from 1808 onwards, including several portraits of empress Joséphine de Beauharnais, one of which is now in the Louvre. In Paris he was friends with fellow Swiss artists Wolfgang-Adam Töpffer and Firmin Massot (both based there) and painted several group portraits of them and himself. From Paris he also visited Switzerland, Belgium and the Netherlands.

In 1816 he made a miniature portrait of Madame de Staël in Geneva - an engraving after it brought him great fame. Alongside his many miniatures of Swiss, English and French figures, he also produced watercolour, ink and oil portraits. His handbook on oil painting was published in Paris and Strasbourg to great success and was translated into German and English. In Geneva in 1828 he was made director of the School of Figure Painting, holding that post until his death in the city eight years later.
