= On Germany =

1813 book by Germaine de Staël

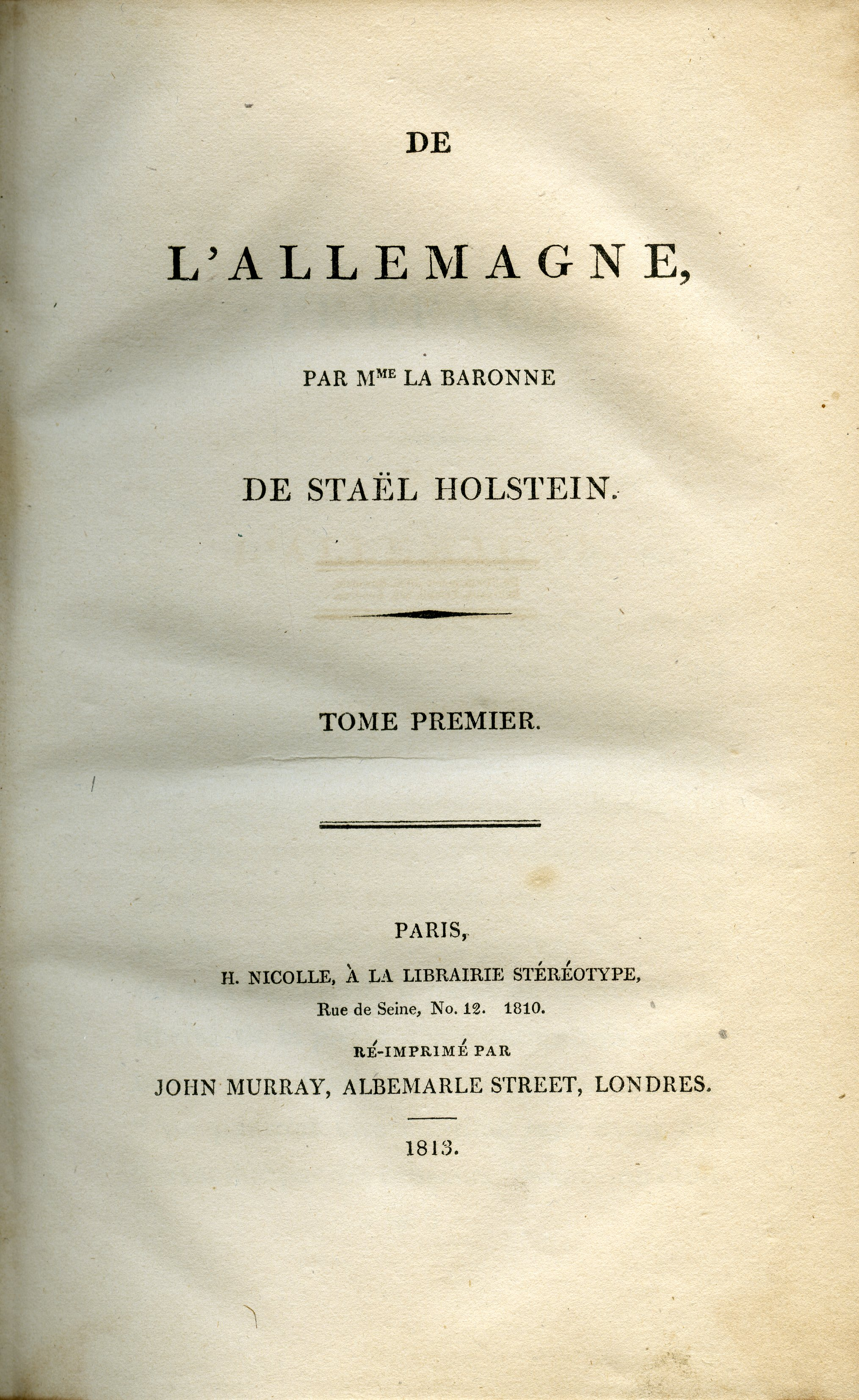
Title page from the first volume (London, 1813)

On Germany (French: De l'Allemagne), also known in English as Germany, is a book about German culture and in particular German Romanticism, written by the French writer Germaine de Staël. It promotes Romantic literature, introducing that term to readers in France and other parts of Europe. The book was published in 1813, after the first edition of 10,000 copies, printed in 1810, had been destroyed by order from Napoleon. The book had a major impact on Romanticism in France and elsewhere.

== Summary ==
The book is divided into four parts: "On Germany and German Customs", "On Literature and the Arts", "On Philosophy and Morals" and "Religion and Enthusiasm". It surveys modern German literature and philosophy, praising writers like Johann Wolfgang von Goethe, Gotthold Ephraim Lessing, Jean Paul and Friedrich Schiller. It introduces French readers to the German concept of Romantic literature, a term derived from the chivalric romances of medieval Europe. Like Friedrich Schlegel, Staël views Romantic literature as modern, because its roots are in the chivalric culture of the Middle Ages, and not in the classical models of ancient Greece and Rome.

Staël writes in favour of literature rooted in Christian culture, which is defined by its preference for the internal life, as practised in the confession. She opposes neoclassicism, which focuses more on action and is prone to use external rules, like those in Aristotle's Poetics and Horace's Ars Poetica. She places Christian belief in opposition to the pagan notion of fate, which she rejects. Romantic poetry, she says, is more relatable than classical imitations, because Christian culture is native to the French people, whereas classical culture is not. She also promotes the use of native French subjects to ensure that literature is relatable.

== Publication ==
A first edition of 10,000 copies was printed in Paris in 1810. Napoleon, however, ordered the entire edition to be destroyed; the preferences for Christian and medieval culture over the neoclassicism of the Napoleonic era, and for German thinkers like Schlegel over French philosophers like Voltaire, were seen as politically subversive, and a possible threat to the established order. A new edition had to be printed in London and was published there in 1813. A commercial success throughout the 19th century, the book was published in 25 French editions alone. An English translation was published by John Murray in 1813 under the title Germany. Segments have been translated by Vivian Folkenflik and published by Columbia University Press in An Extraordinary Woman: Selected Writings of Germaine de Staël (1987), where the English title is On Germany.

== Legacy ==
On Germany had a greater influence than any of Staël's other works. Along with The Genius of Christianity (1802) by François-René de Chateaubriand, it pointed out the direction that French Romanticism would follow. The recommendation to express the inner life, like in the Christian confession, led the way for a tradition of French confessional literature. The book also had significant impact elsewhere, including the United Kingdom and the United States, where it was the work that introduced the term Romanticism. The scholar John Claiborne Isbell compares its impact to that of Victor Hugo's Hernani (1830), which was seen as a "triumph of Romantic art", writing: "Romanticism outside Germany dates its conscious existence from De l'Allemagne: recognising its pivotal role will give France back twenty stolen years of literary history, and restore the missing origin of this Europe-wide transformation of art and society. Hugo, Leopardi, Emerson do not come before, they come after: they are a second generation."

== See also ==
- 19th-century French literature
