= Sophie Doin =

French novelist and essayist

Sophie Doin (née, Mamy; 1800–1846), was a French novelist and essayist whose writings contributed to the renewal of abolitionism in France during the 1820s. She targeted abuses in the French colonies, most notably Guadeloupe and Martinique, where slavery continued for decades after the declaration of Haitian independence in 1804. In her various antislavery writings, notably the novel La Famille noire, ou la Traite de l’esclavage (The Black Family, or the Slave Trade), she drew the French public's attention to the injustices committed by the slave system. She called for a more humane treatment of Blacks, for the abolition of the slave trade, and for religious and practical education that would prepare slaves for eventual emancipation.

== Biography ==
Doin was the only child of a wealthy Parisian family. In 1820 she married a doctor, Guillaume-Tell Doin, who was in poor health and financially irresponsible. Conflicts arose in the final years of their marriage, which Doin recounts in her autobiographical works. Until that time, however, Sophie and Guillaume Tell worked together to further a wide range of philanthropic and social causes including Greek independence. They were Protestants, as were other antislavery writers including Auguste de Staël and his mother Germaine de Staël.

During the 1820s, when an anti-slavery movement developed in France, Sophie and Guillaume Tell were associated with the Société de la morale chrétienne, which provided antislavery information, largely from sources in Britain, as abolitionism in the United Kingdom was far more developed than in France. Members of the Société were liberals who typically supported a constitutional monarchy.

== Writings ==
La Famille noire, ou la Traite de l’esclavage is Doin's most significant abolitionist work. Written in a polemic style, La Famille noire draws on British sources to argue for the abolition of the slave trade and illustratues the fate of Blacks living under slavery. She draws attention to their strong family bonds and aptitude for education. She pleads for abolition of the slave trade although she does not espouse the cause of full emancipation, which would not be advocated in France until the 1840s. In her short stories "Blanche et noir" and "Noire et blanc" she promotes interracial marriage. She celebrates the independence gained by Haitians in 1804 and sees Haiti as a beacon of hope for blacks worldwide. In the short story "Le Négrier, " as in her other writings, Doin expresses her view that women's empathy and moral superiority give them a special role to play in the antislavery movement.

== Legacy ==
Sophie Doin remains a minor figure in the history of 19th century French literature. Her works are overshadowed by the more well-known French writings about slaves, notably Claire de Duras's Ourika and Victor Hugo's Bug Jargal.

== Selected works ==
- 1825: La Famille noire, ou la Traite de l’esclavage
- 1826: Cornélie, nouvelle grecque, suivie de six nouvelles
- 1831: Cinq Chansons
- 1831: Poésies
- 1832-1833: Théâtre
- 1835: Quelques Pensées d’une femme sincèrement dévouée à la royauté de juillet
- 1836-1838: Le Christianisme, journal populaire
- 1842: Avis au public
- 1842: Simple Mémoire
- 1843: Un Cri de mère
- 1845: Ma Semaine
