= Angelica Goodden =

British academic and author

- Born: 1953 (age 72–73)
- Education: M.A., D.Litt.
- Occupations: Emeritus professor of French, fellow of St Hilda’s College
- Website: www.mod-langs.ox.ac.uk/people/a-r-goodden

Angelica Goodden (born 1953) is a British academic. She is an emeritus professor at Oxford University and the author of multiple books including Miss Angel: The Art and World of Angelica Kauffman and Madame de Staël: The Dangerous Exile.

== Biography ==
Goodden is a fellow of St Hilda's College, Oxford University, whose principal area of research and study is 18th- and 19th-century French culture, in particular literature and painting. She has authored several biographical books, including on subjects such as Élisabeth Vigée Le Brun, Germaine de Staël, and Jean-Jacques Rousseau.

In 2005, she published a biography of the Swiss neoclassical painter Angelica Kaufman. The book, Miss Angel: The Art and World of Angelica Kauffman, was generally well received by critics. John McEwan of the Literary Review called it "an amusing and solid biography". Kirkus concluded their review saying that "Goodden's well-measured life of the artist may help bring Kauffman's oeuvre back to light". However, Tom Williams for The Observer noted that the book made it "impossible to engage with the woman who was Angelica Kauffman".

Goodden also publishes reviews for the journal French Studies and the London Review of Books.

== Personal life ==
As a sufferer of multiple sclerosis, Gooden has developed innovative solutions to maintain access and accommodate her specialised needs.

== Works ==
- Actio and Persuasion. Dramatic Performance in Eighteenth-Century France (1986; ISBN 9780198158363)
- The Complete Lover: Eros, Nature and Artifice in the 18th-Century French Novel (1989; ISBN 9780198158202)
- The Sweetness of Life: A Biography of Élisabeth Louise Vigée Le Brun (1997; ISBN 9780233990217)
- Madame de Staël: Delphine and Corinne (2000; ISBN 9780729304177)
- The Backward Look: Memory and Writing Self in France 1580-1920 (2001; ISBN 9781351198493)
- The Eighteenth-Century Body: Art, History, Literature, Medicine (Editor; 2002; ISBN 9783906768502)
- Diderot and the Body (2002; ISBN 9781900755566)
- Miss Angel: The Art and World of Angelica Kauffman (2005; ISBN 9781446448359)
- Madame de Staël: The Dangerous Exile (2008; ISBN 9780191528774)
- Rousseau's Hand: The Crafting of a Writer (2013; ISBN 9780199683833)
- The Marvellous Miss Macbeths (2023; ISBN 9781838406530)
