= Germaine de Staël =

French novelist and woman of letters (1766–1817)

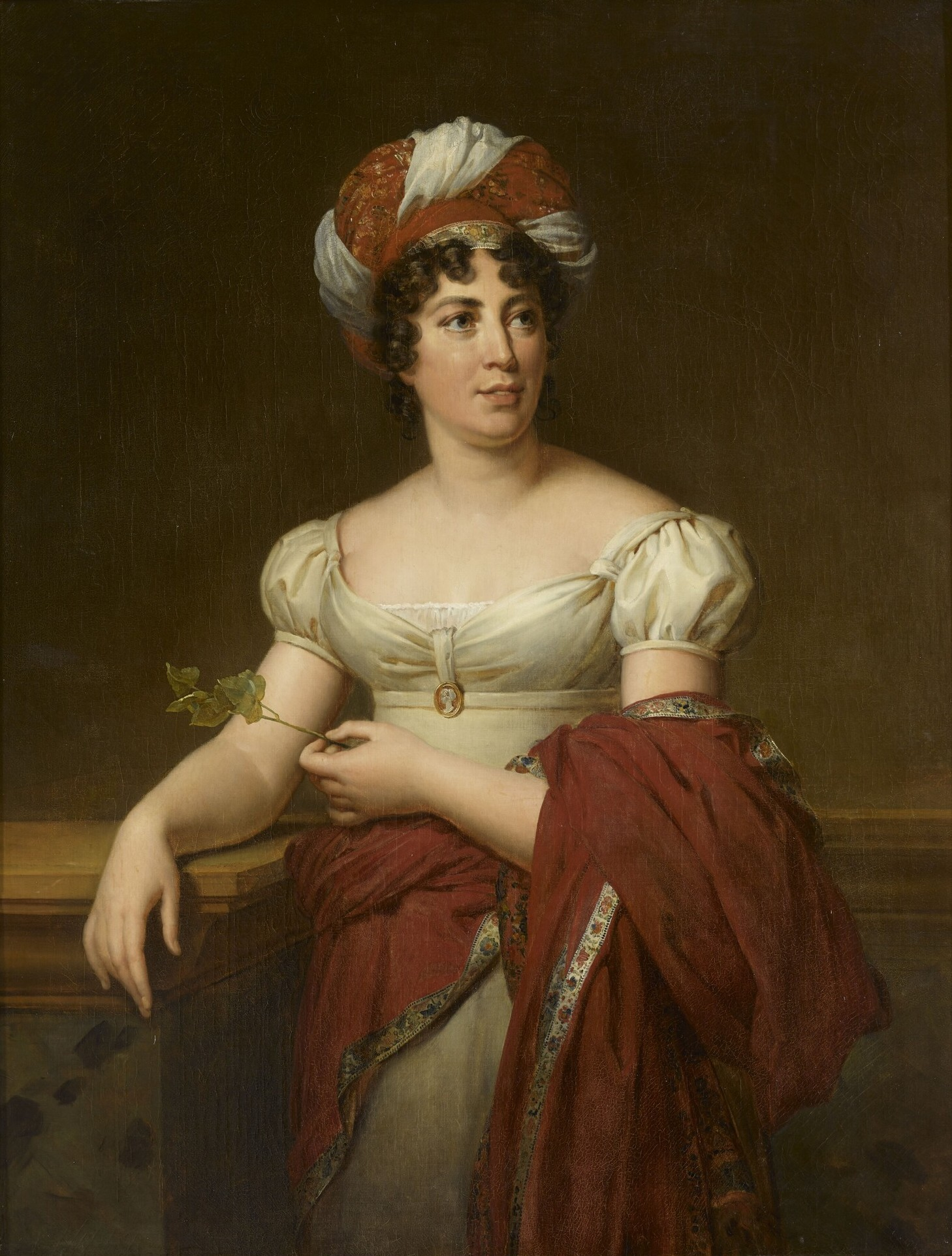
- Portrait by François Gérard, 1813
- Born: Anne Louise Germaine Necker; 22 April 1766; Paris, Kingdom of France
- Died: 14 July 1817 (aged 51); Paris, Kingdom of France
- Spouses: Erik Magnus Staël von Holstein (m. 1786; died 1802) Albert Jean Michel de Rocca (m. 1816) died 1818
- Parents: Jacques Necker; Suzanne Curchod

Philosophical work
- School: Romanticism
- Main interests: Cosmopolitanism; representative government; constitutionalism
- Notable works: Delphine (1802); Corinne ou l'Italie (1807); De l'Allemagne (1813)

Signature
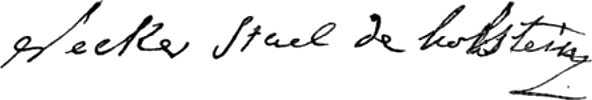

Anne Louise Germaine de Staël-Holstein (French: [an lwiz ʒɛʁmɛn də stal ɔlstajn]; née Necker; 22 April 1766 – 14 July 1817), commonly known as Madame de Staël (/dəˈstɑːl/ də-STAHL; French: [madam də stal]), was a prominent Genevan and French novelist, woman of letters, philosopher, and political theorist in both Parisian and Genevan intellectual circles. She was the daughter of banker and French finance minister Jacques Necker and Suzanne Curchod, a respected salonist and writer. Throughout her life, she held a moderate stance during the tumultuous periods of the French Revolution and the Napoleonic era, persisting until the time of the French Restoration.

Her presence at critical events such as the Estates General of 1789 and the 1789 Declaration of the Rights of Man and of the Citizen underscored her engagement in the political discourse of her time. However, Madame de Staël faced exile for extended periods: initially during the Reign of Terror and subsequently due to personal persecution by Napoleon. She claimed to have discerned the tyrannical nature and ambitions of his rule ahead of many others.

During her exile, she fostered the Coppet group, a network that spanned across Europe, positioning herself at its heart.

Her literary works, emphasizing individuality and passion, left an enduring imprint on European intellectual thought. De Staël's repeated championing of Romanticism contributed significantly to its widespread recognition. Within her work, de Staël not only advocates for the necessity of public expression but also sounds cautionary notes about its potential hazards.

== Childhood ==
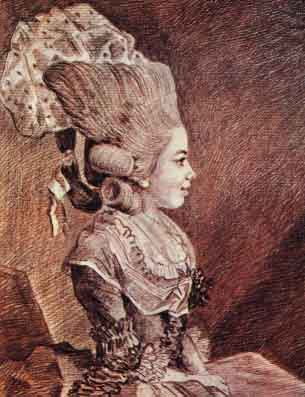
Germaine Necker by Carmontelle

Anne Louise Germaine Necker was the only child of the Swiss governess Suzanne Curchod, who had an aptitude for mathematics and science, and prominent Genevan banker and statesman Jacques Necker. Jacques was the son of Karl Friedrich Necker from Brandenburg (Holy Roman Empire), himself a lawyer and professor. Jacques became the Director-General of Finance under King Louis XVI. Mme Staël would later host one of the most popular salons in Paris in Rue de la Chaussée-d'Antin. Mme Necker wanted her daughter educated according to the principles of the Swiss philosopher Jean-Jacques Rousseau; Germaine's father instilled in her intellectual rigor and Calvinist discipline. On Fridays, Mme Necker regularly brought Germaine to sit at her feet in the salon. Even at a young age, Germaine engaged in stimulating conversations with her mother's guests. Celebrities such as the Comte de Buffon, Jean-François Marmontel, Melchior Grimm, Edward Gibbon, the Abbé Raynal, Jean-François de la Harpe, Jacques-Henri Bernardin de Saint-Pierre, Denis Diderot, and Jean d'Alembert were frequent visitors. At the age of 13, she read Montesquieu, Shakespeare, Rousseau and Dante. Her parents' social life led to a somewhat neglected and wild Germaine, unwilling to bow to her mother's demands.

Her father "is remembered today for taking the unprecedented step in 1781 of making public the country's budget, a novelty in an absolute monarchy where the state of the national finances had always been kept secret, leading to his dismissal by the King in May of that year." The family eventually took up residence in 1784 at Château de Coppet, an estate on Lake Geneva. The family returned to the Paris region in 1785.

== Marriage ==
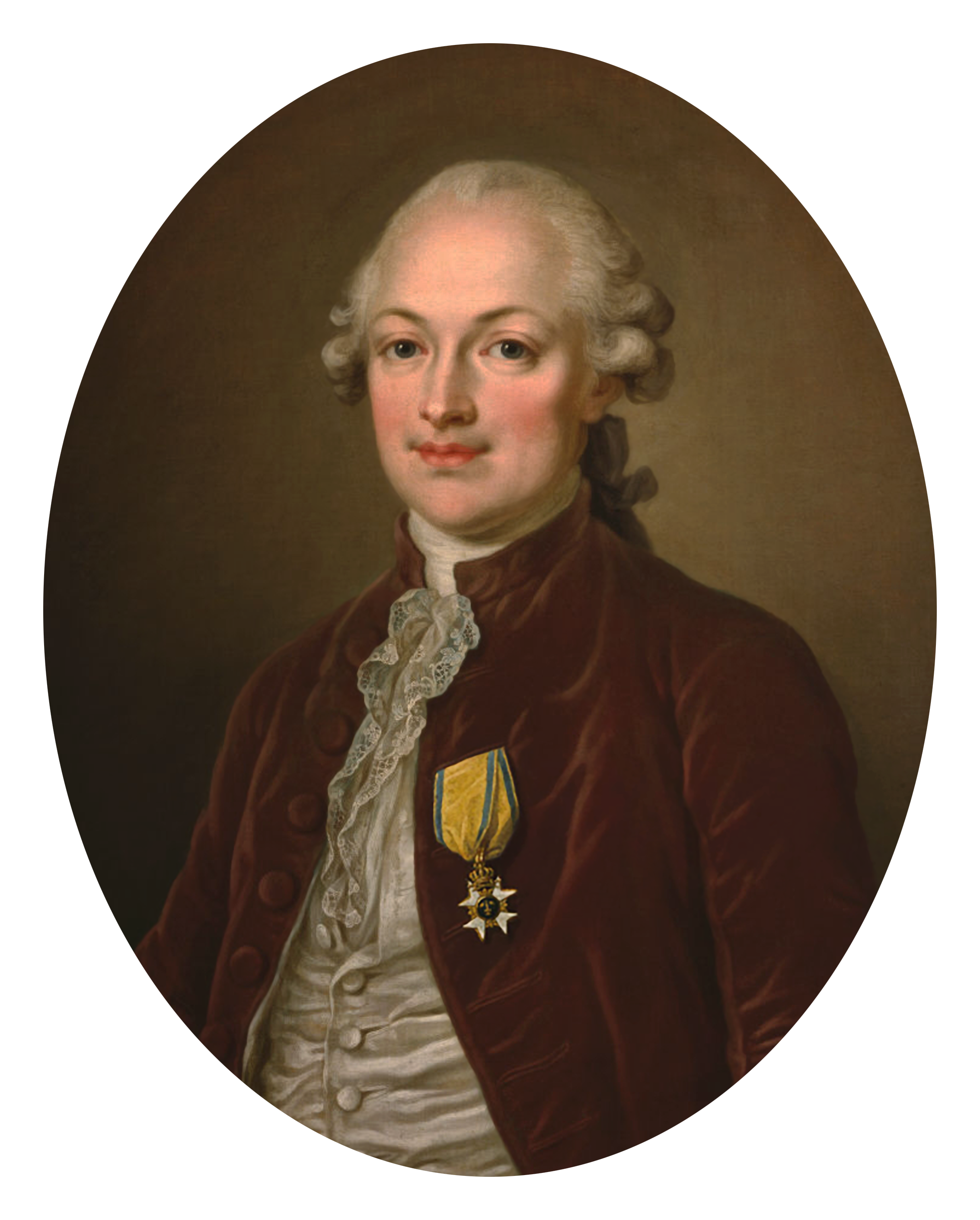
Baron Erik Magnus Staël von Holstein, 1796 by Ulrika Pasch

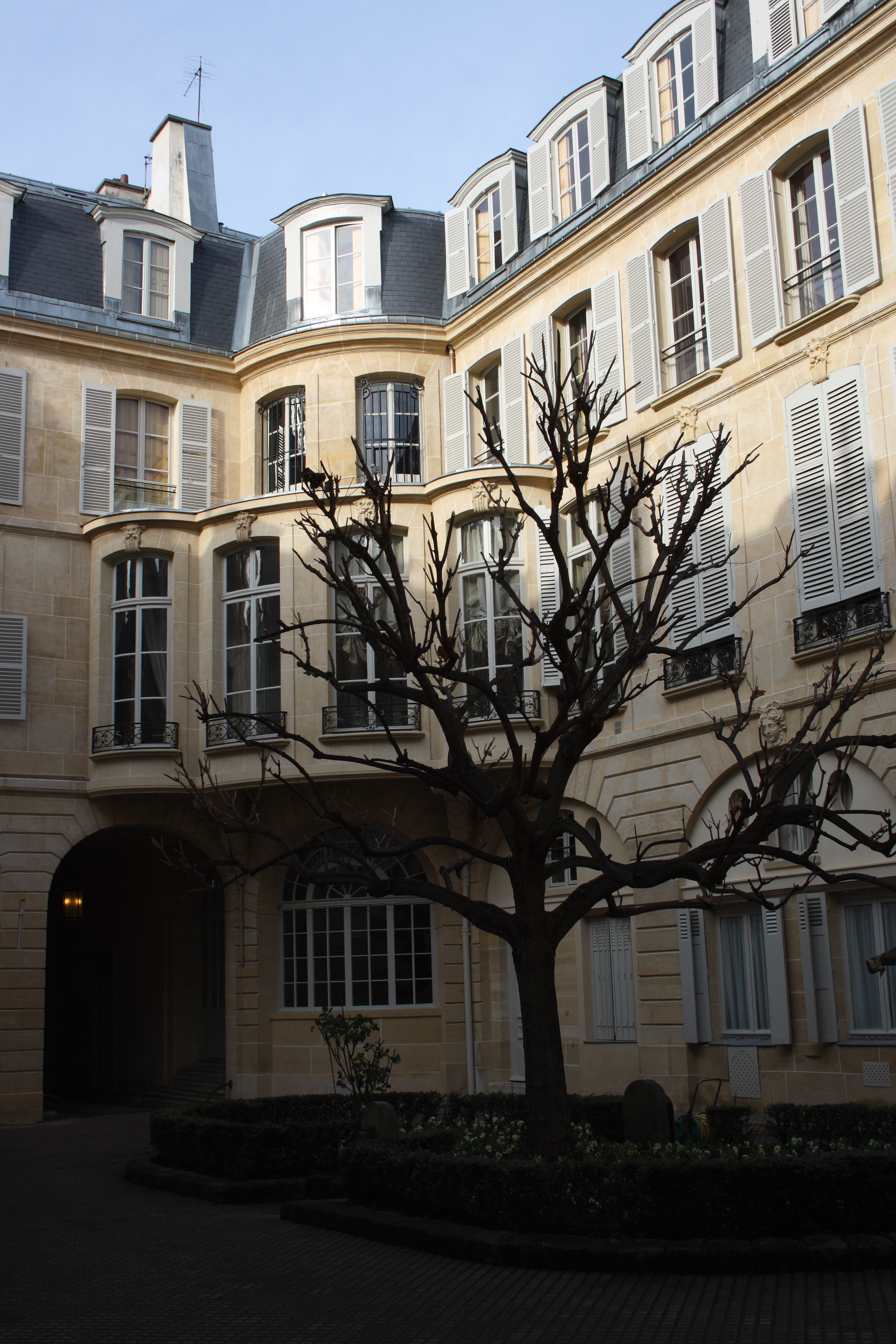
The Swedish Embassy, Hôtel de Ségur, later Hôtel de Salm-Dyck

Aged 11, Germaine desired to marry Edward Gibbon, a visitor to her mother's salon whom she found most attractive, and suggested this to her mother. Then, she reasoned, he would always be around for her. In 1783, at seventeen, she was courted by William Pitt the Younger and by Comte de Guibert, whose conversation, she thought, was the most far-ranging, spirited and fertile she had ever known. When she did not accept their offers Germaine's parents became impatient. With the help of Marie-Charlotte Hippolyte de Boufflers, a marriage was arranged with Baron Erik Magnus Staël von Holstein, a Protestant and attaché of the Swedish legation to France. The wedding took place on 14 January 1786 in the Swedish embassy at 97, Rue du Bac; Germaine was 19, and her husband 37. On the whole, the marriage seems to have been workable for both parties, although neither seems to have had much affection for the other. Madame de Staël continued to write miscellaneous works, including the three-act romantic drama Sophie (1786) and the five-act tragedy Jeanne Grey (1787). The baron, also a gambler, obtained great benefits from the match as he received 80,000 pounds and was confirmed as lifetime ambassador to Paris.

== Revolutionary activities ==
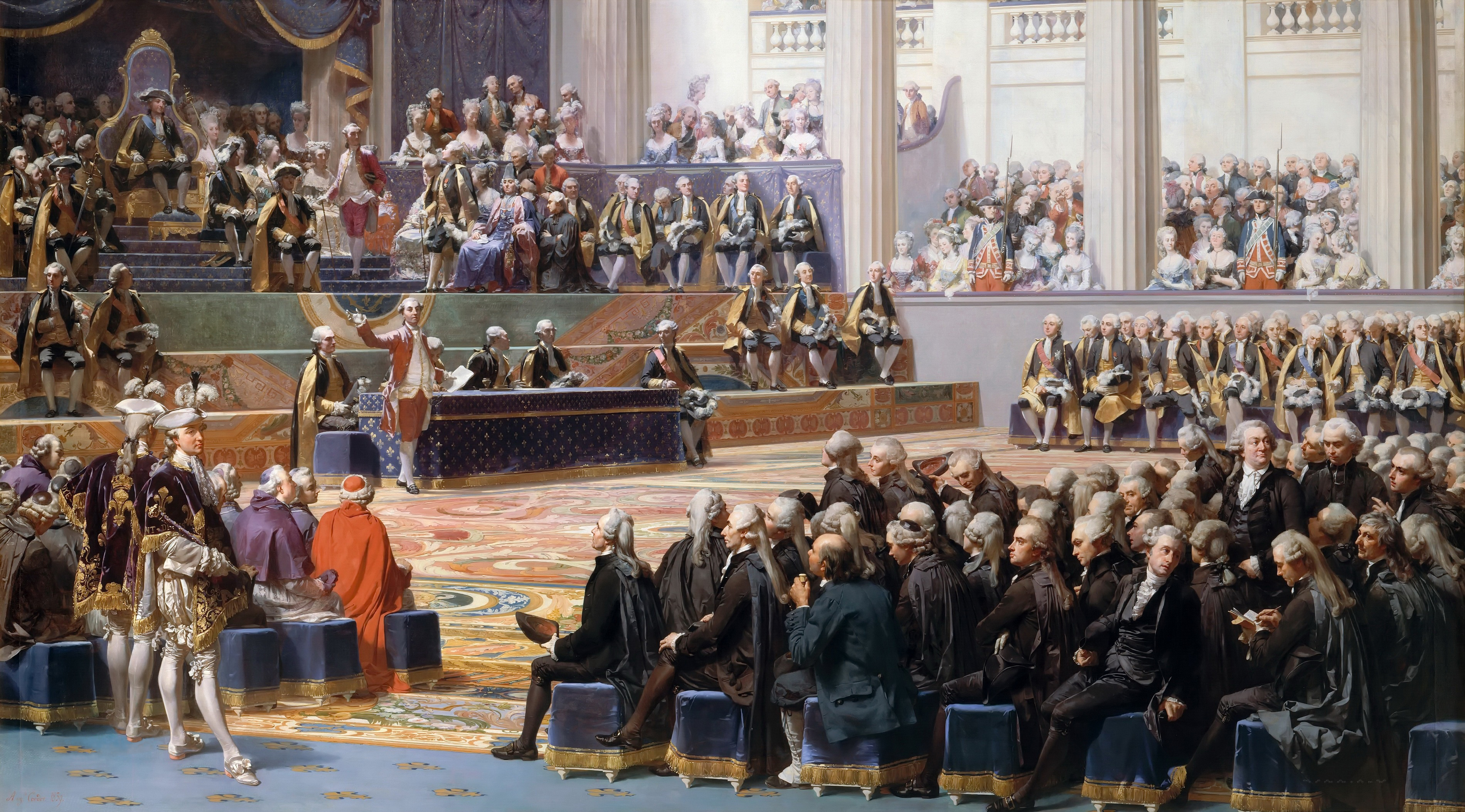
On 4 and 5 May 1789 Germaine de Staël watched the assembly of the Estates-General in Versailles, where she met the young Mathieu de Montmorency.

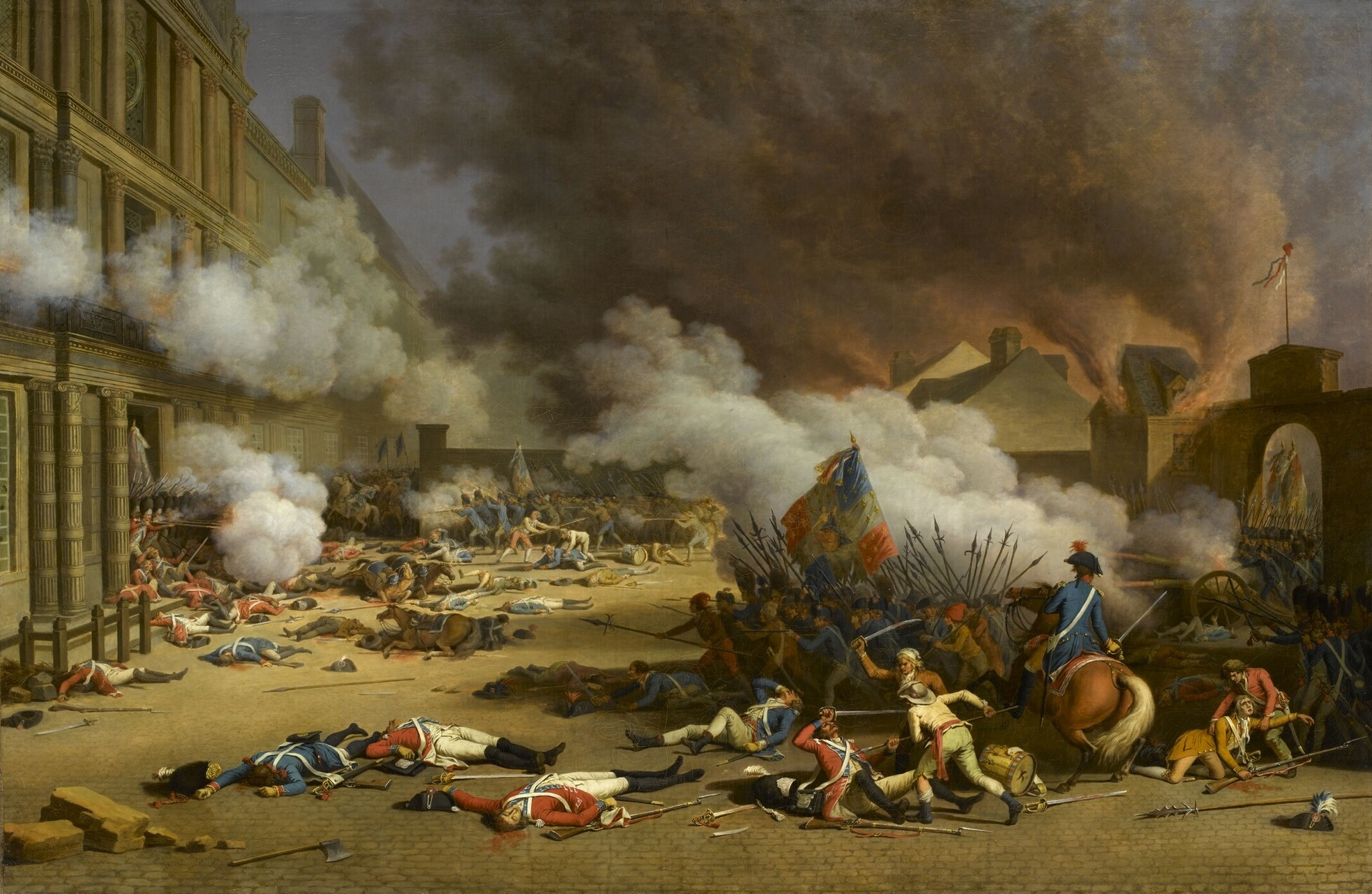
"Dix Août 1792. Siege et prise du Chateau des Tuileries": French soldiers (volunteers) and citizens storming the Tuileries Palace to capture the royal family and end the monarchy.

In 1788, de Staël published Letters on the works and character of J.J. Rousseau. De Staël was at this time enthusiastic about the mixture of Rousseau's ideas about love and Montesquieu's on politics.

In December 1788 her father persuaded Louis XVI to double the number of deputies at the Third Estate in order to gain enough support to raise taxes to pay for the excessive costs of supporting the revolutionaries in America. This approach had serious repercussions on Necker's reputation; he appeared to consider the Estates-General as a facility designed to help the administration rather than to reform the government. In an argument with the king, whose speech on 23 June he did not attend, Necker was dismissed and exiled on 11 July. Her parents left France on the same day in unpopularity and disgrace. On Sunday, 12 July the news became public, and an angry Camille Desmoulins suggested storming the Bastille. On 16 July Necker was reappointed; he entered Versailles in triumph. His efforts to clean up public finances were unsuccessful and his idea of a National Bank failed. Necker was attacked by Jean-Paul Marat and Count Mirabeau in the Constituante, when he did not agree with using assignats as legal tender. He resigned on 4 September 1790. Accompanied by their son-in-law, Necker and his wife left for Switzerland, without the two million livres, half of his fortune, that he had loaned as an investment in the public treasury in 1778.

During this time of her political thoughts, de Staël was focused on the problem of leadership, or the perceived lack of it. In her later works she often returned to the idea that "the French Revolution has been characterized by a surprising absence of eminent personalities".

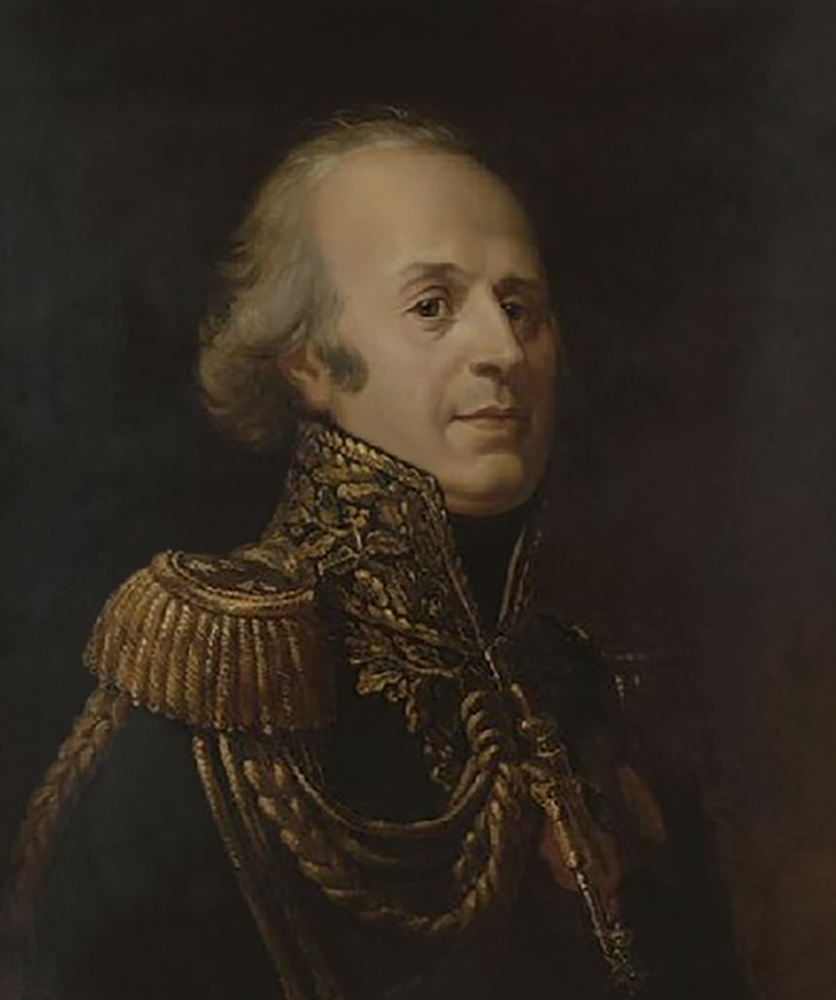
Louis-Marie de Narbonne by Herminie Déhérain

Following the 1791 French legislative election, and after the French Constitution of 1791 was announced in the National Assembly, she resigned from a political career and decided not to stand for re-election. "Fine arts and letters will occupy my leisure." She did, however, play an important role in the succession of Comte de Montmorin as the Minister of Foreign Affairs, and in the appointment of Narbonne as minister of War and continued to be centre stage behind the scenes. Marie Antoinette wrote to Hans Axel Fersen: "Count Louis de Narbonne is finally Minister of War, since yesterday; what a glory for Mme de Staël and what a joy for her to have the whole army, all to herself." In 1792 the French Legislative Assembly saw an unprecedented turnover of ministers, six ministers of the interior, seven ministers of foreign affairs, and nine ministers of war. After the insurrection of 10 August 1792, De Staël offered baron Malouet a plan of escape for the royal family to Dieppe. On 20 August De Narbonne arrived in England on a German passport. As there was no government, militant members of the Insurrectionary Commune were given extensive police powers from the provisional, executive council, "to detain, interrogate and incarcerate suspects without anything resembling due process of law". She helped De Narbonne, dismissed for plotting, to hide under the altar in the chapel in the Swedish embassy, and lectured the sans-culottes from the section in the hall.

On Sunday 2 September, the day the Elections for the National Convention and the September massacres began, she fled herself in the garb of an ambassadress. Her carriage was stopped and the crowd forced her into the Paris town hall, where Robespierre presided. That same evening she was conveyed home, escorted by the procurator Louis Pierre Manuel. The next day the commissioner to the Commune of Paris Jean-Lambert Tallien arrived with a new passport and accompanied her to the edge of the barricade.

== Salons at Coppet and Paris ==
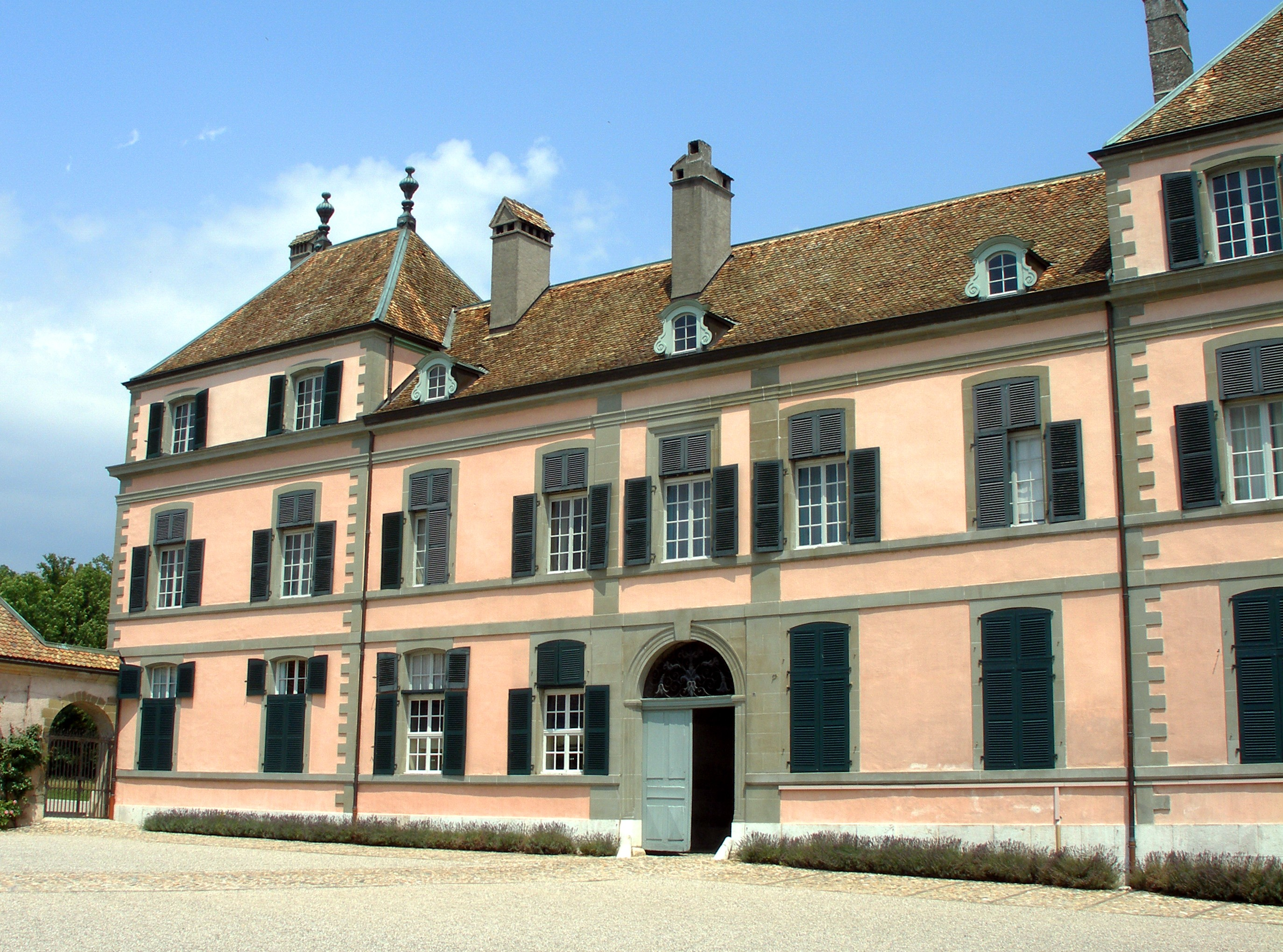
Château de Coppet near Nyon

After her flight from Paris, de Staël moved to Rolle in Switzerland, where Albert was born. She was supported by de Montmorency and the Marquis de Jaucourt, whom she had previously supplied with Swedish passports. In January 1793, she made a four-month visit to England to be with her then-lover, the Comte de Narbonne, at Juniper Hall. (Since 1 February, France and Great Britain had been at war.) Within a few weeks, she was pregnant; it was apparently one of the reasons for the scandal she caused in England. According to Fanny Burney, the result was that her father urged Fanny to avoid the company of de Staël and her circle of French Émigrés in Surrey. Suzanne Curchod, De Staël's mother, strongly disapproved of the affair. De Staël met Horace Walpole, James Mackintosh, Lord Sheffield, a friend of Edward Gibbon, and Lord Loughborough, the new Lord Chancellor. She was not impressed with the condition of women in English society, finding that they were not afforded the voice and respect they deserved. Staël viewed freedom as twofold: political freedom from institutions and individual freedom from social norms.

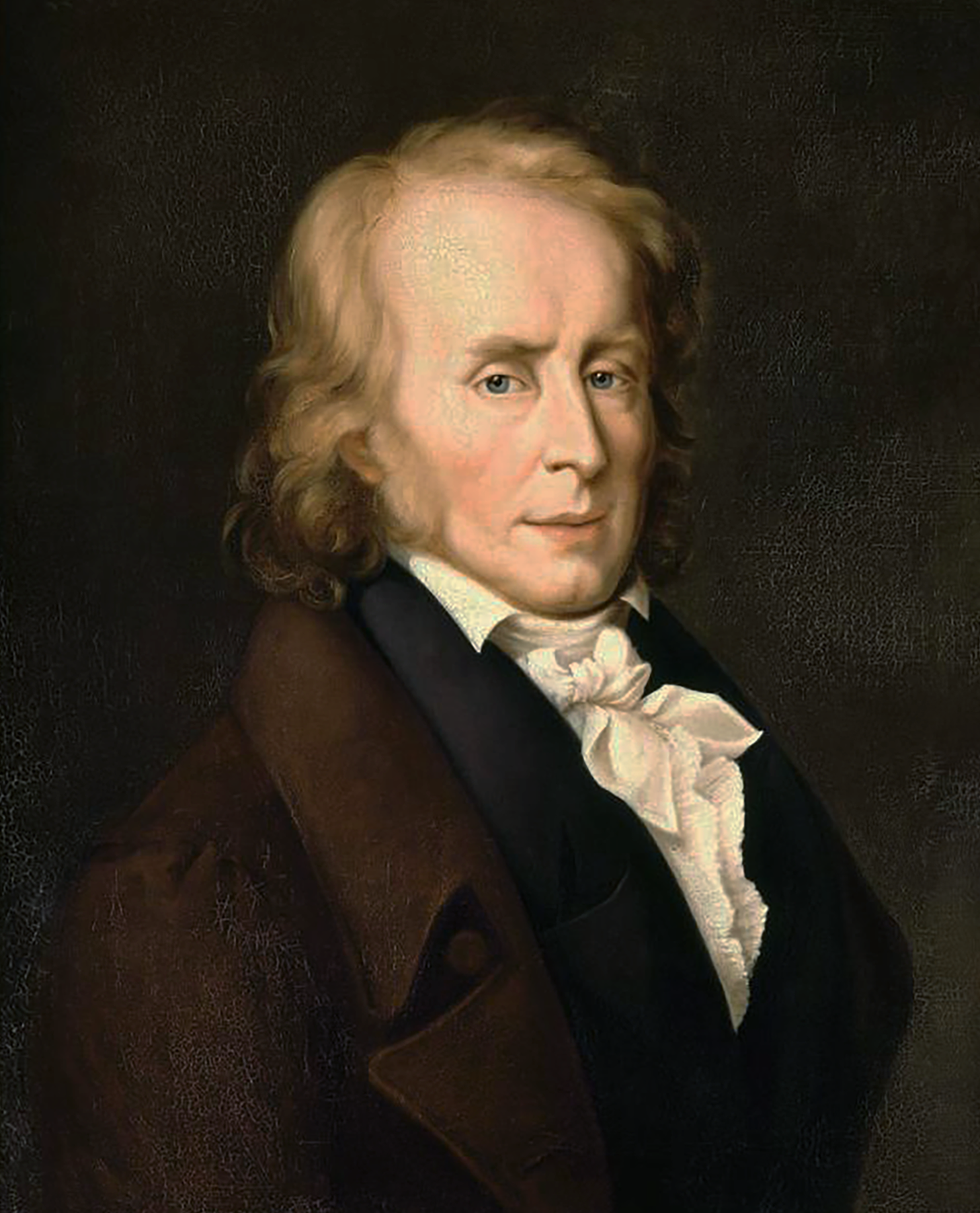
Benjamin Constant by Lina Vallier

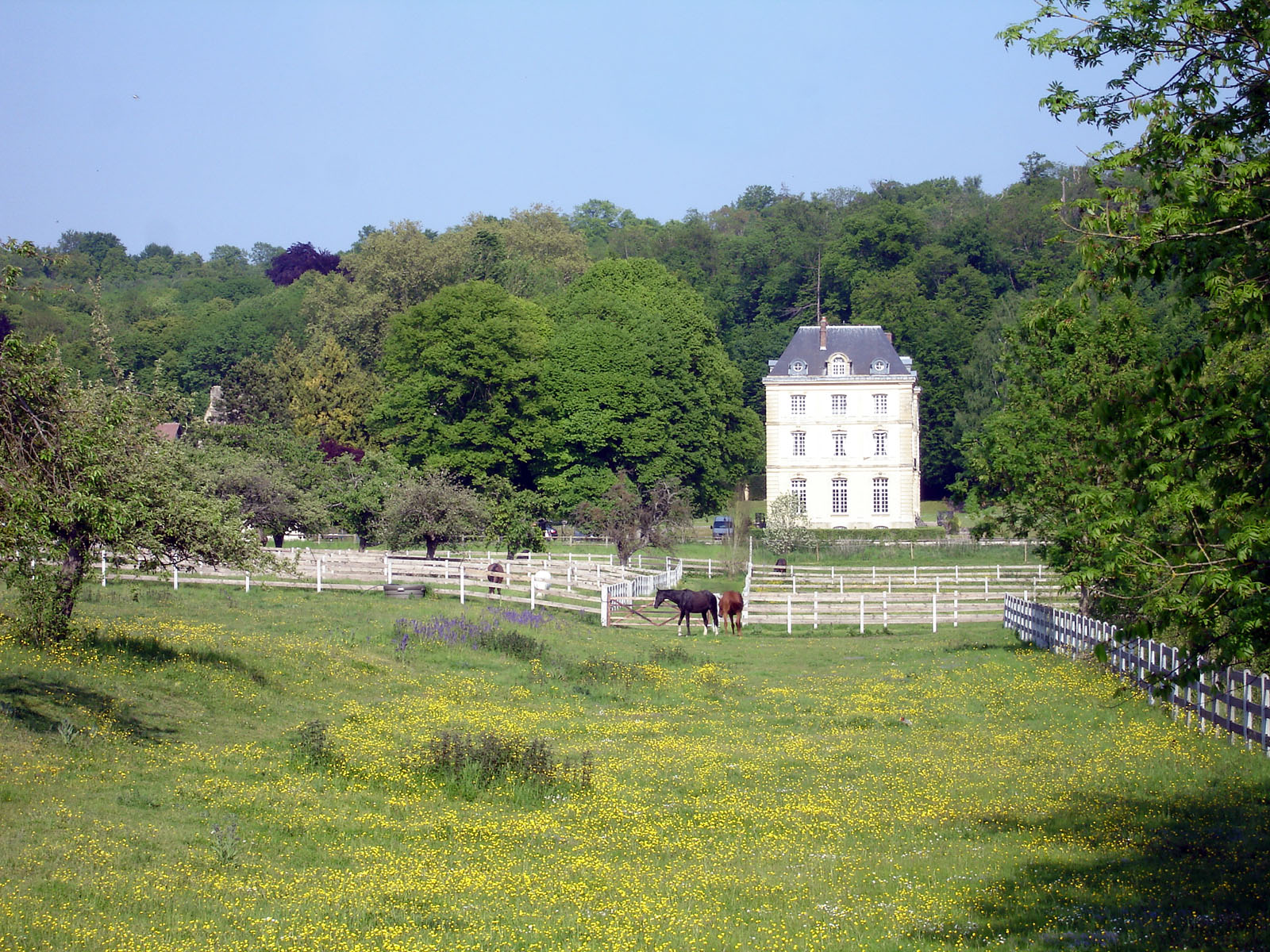
In 1797 de Staël and Benjamin Constant lived in the remains of the Abbey of Herivaux.

In the summer of 1793, de Staël returned to Switzerland, because she recognized De Narbonne was indifferent towards her and desired to end their relationship. De Staël reacted to this with misery and frustration. She published a defence of the character of Marie Antoinette, entitled, Réflexions sur le procès de la Reine, 1793 ("Reflections on the Queen's trial"). In de Staël's view, France should have adapted from an absolute to a constitutional monarchy as was the case in England. Living in Jouxtens-Mézery, farther away from the French border than Coppet, Germaine was visited by Adolph Ribbing. Count Ribbing was living in exile, after his conviction for taking part in a conspiracy to assassinate the Swedish king, Gustav III. In September 1794, the recently divorced Benjamin Constant visited her, wanting to meet her before he committed suicide.

In May 1795, de Staël moved to Paris, now with Constant in tow, as her protégé and lover. De Staël rejected the idea of the right of resistance – which had been introduced into the never implemented French Constitution of 1793, and was removed from the Constitution of 1795. In 1796, she published Sur l'influence des passions, in which she praised suicide and discussed how passions affect the happiness of individuals and societies, a book which attracted the attention of the German writers Schiller and Goethe.

"Passionate love is natural to human beings and to yield oneself to love will not result in abandoning virtue".

Still absorbed by French politics, de Staël reopened her salon. It was during these years that Mme de Staël arguably exerted most political influence. For a time she was still visible in the diverse and eccentric society of the mid-1790s. However, on the 13 Vendémiaire the Comité de salut public ordered her to leave Paris after accusations of politicking, and put Constant in detention for one night. De Staël spent that autumn in the spa of Forges-les-Eaux. She was considered a threat to political stability and mistrusted by both sides in the political conflict. She corresponded with Francisco de Miranda whom she wished to see again. The couple moved to Ormesson-sur-Marne where they stayed with Mathieu Montmorency. In Summer 1796 Constant founded the "Cercle constitutionnel" in Luzarches with de Staël's support. In May 1797, she was back in Paris and eight months pregnant. She organized the Club du Salm in Hôtel de Salm. De Stael succeeded in getting Talleyrand from the list of Émigrés and on his return from the United States to have him appointed Minister of Foreign Affairs in July. From the coup of 18 Fructidor it was announced that anyone campaigning to restore the monarchy or the French Constitution of 1793 would be shot without trial. Germaine moved to Saint-Ouen, on her father's estate and became a close friend of the beautiful and wealthy Juliette Récamier to whom she sold her parents' house in the Rue de la Chaussée-d'Antin.

In 1797, de Staël completed the initial part of her first most substantial contribution to political and constitutional theory, "On the Current Circumstances Which Can End the Revolution". The work remained in manuscript form and was not discovered until the end of the nineteenth century. In it, Staël deplores the violence, arbitrariness, and materialism that has plagued the revolutionary years, arguing that their roots are to be found in the history of France. To address these issues and end the revolutionary upheaval, she proposes constitutional changes both in terms of the relationships between the key powers of the state and in terms of religion. Specifically, she argues that France undergoes a reformation by adopting Protestantism as a religion of state. The proposal was not simply a result of her own protestant background but it also sought to stall and redirect the Directory government's plans to adopt theophilanthropy as a religion of state.

== Conflict with Napoleon ==
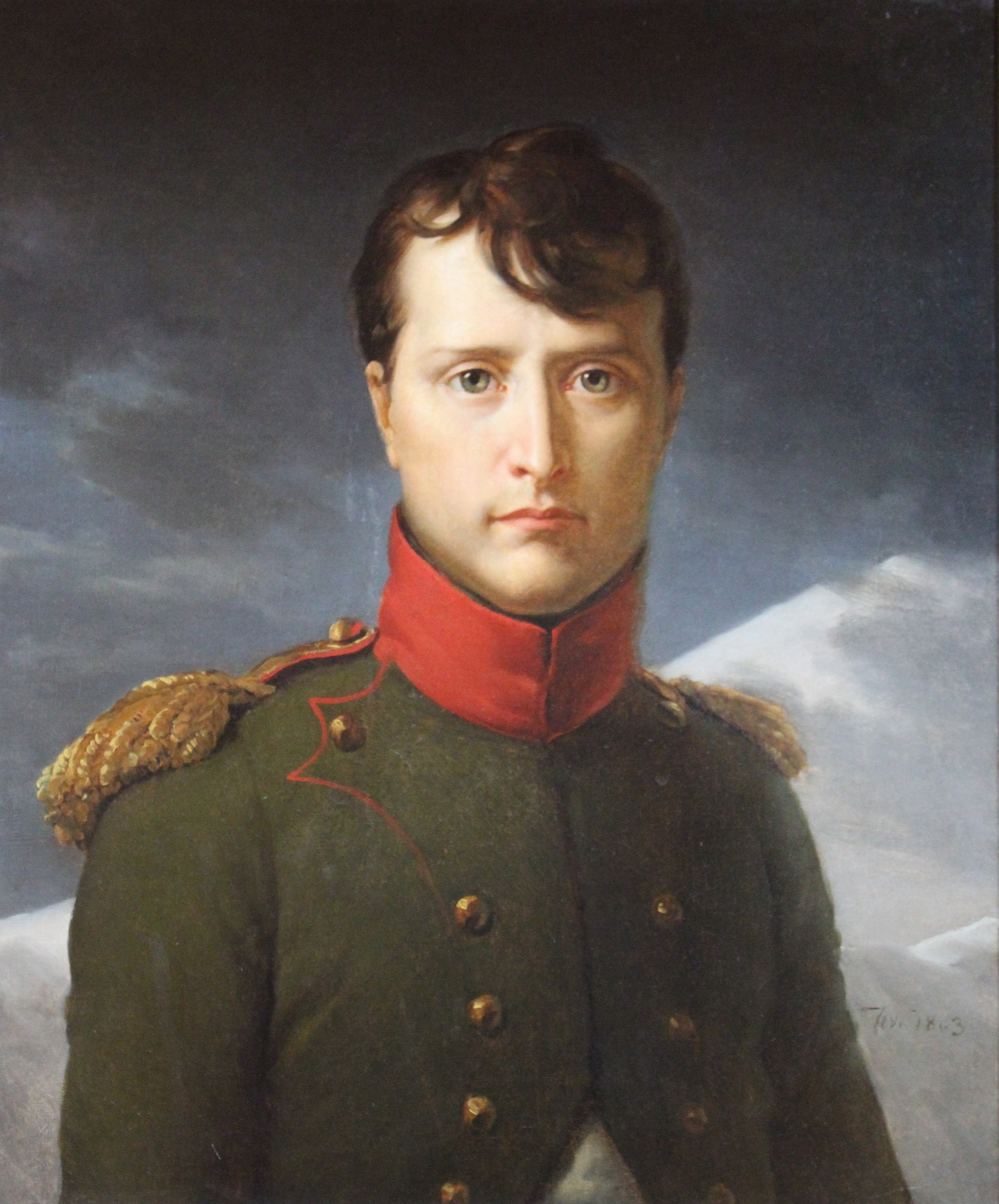
Napoleon Bonaparte in 1803 by François Gérard

On 6 December 1797 de Staël had her first meeting with Napoleon Bonaparte in Talleyrand's office, and met him again on 3 January 1798 during a ball. Though she initially believed Napoleon would be devoted to republican ideals and even welcomed him into her social circle, de Staël became an outspoken critic as his regime grew increasingly authoritarian. She made it clear to him that she did not agree with his planned invasion of Switzerland. He ignored her opinions and would not read her letters. In January 1800, Napoleon appointed Benjamin Constant a member of the Tribunat; not long after, Constant became his enemy. Two years later, Napoleon forced him into exile on account of his speeches which he took to be actually written by Mme de Staël. In August 1802, Napoleon was elected first consul for life. This put de Staël into opposition to him both for personal and political reasons. In her view, Napoleon had begun to resemble Machiavelli's princes in The Prince (in fact tyrants); while for Napoleon, Voltaire, Jean-Jacques Rousseau and their followers were the cause of the French Revolution. This view was cemented when Jacques Necker published his "Last Views on Politics and Finance" and his daughter, her "De la littérature considérée dans ses rapports avec les institutions sociales". It was her first philosophical treatment of the Europe question: it dealt with such factors as nationality, history, and social institutions. Napoleon started a campaign against her latest publication. He did not like her cultural determinism and generalizations, in which she stated that "an artist must be of his own time". In his opinion a woman should stick to knitting. He said about her, according to the Memoirs of Madame de Rémusat, that she "teaches people to think who had never thought before, or who had forgotten how to think". It became clear that the first man of France and de Staël were not likely ever to get along together.

"It seems to me that life's circumstances, being ephemeral, teach us less about durable truths than the fictions based on those truths; and that the best lessons of delicacy and self-respect are to be found in novels where the feelings are so naturally portrayed that you fancy you are witnessing real life as you read."

De Staël published a provocative, anti-Catholic novel Delphine, in which the femme incomprise (misunderstood woman) living in Paris between 1789 and 1792, is confronted with conservative ideas about divorce after the Concordat of 1801. In this tragic novel, influenced by Goethe's The Sorrows of Young Werther and Rousseau's Julie, ou la nouvelle Héloïse, she reflects on the legal and practical aspects of divorce, the arrests and the September Massacres, and the fate of the émigrés. (During the winter of 1794 it seems De Staël was pondering a divorce and whether to marry Ribbing.) The main characters have traits of the unstable Benjamin Constant, and Talleyrand is depicted as an old woman, herself as the heroine with the liberal view of the Italian aristocrat and politician Melzi d'Eril.

When Constant moved to Maffliers in September 1803 de Staël went to see him and let Napoleon know she would be wise and cautious. Thereupon her house immediately became popular again among her friends, but Napoleon, informed by Madame de Genlis, suspected a conspiracy. "Her extensive network of connections – which included foreign diplomats and known political opponents, as well as members of the government and of Bonaparte's own family – was in itself a source of suspicion and alarm for the government." Her protection of Jean Gabriel Peltier – who plotted the death of Napoleon – influenced his decision on 13 October 1803 to exile her without trial.

== Years of exile ==
For ten years, de Staël was not allowed to come within 40 leagues (almost 200 km) of Paris. She accused Napoleon of "persecuting a woman and her children". On 23 October, she left for Germany "out of pride", in the hope of gaining support and to be able to return home as soon as possible.

=== German travels ===
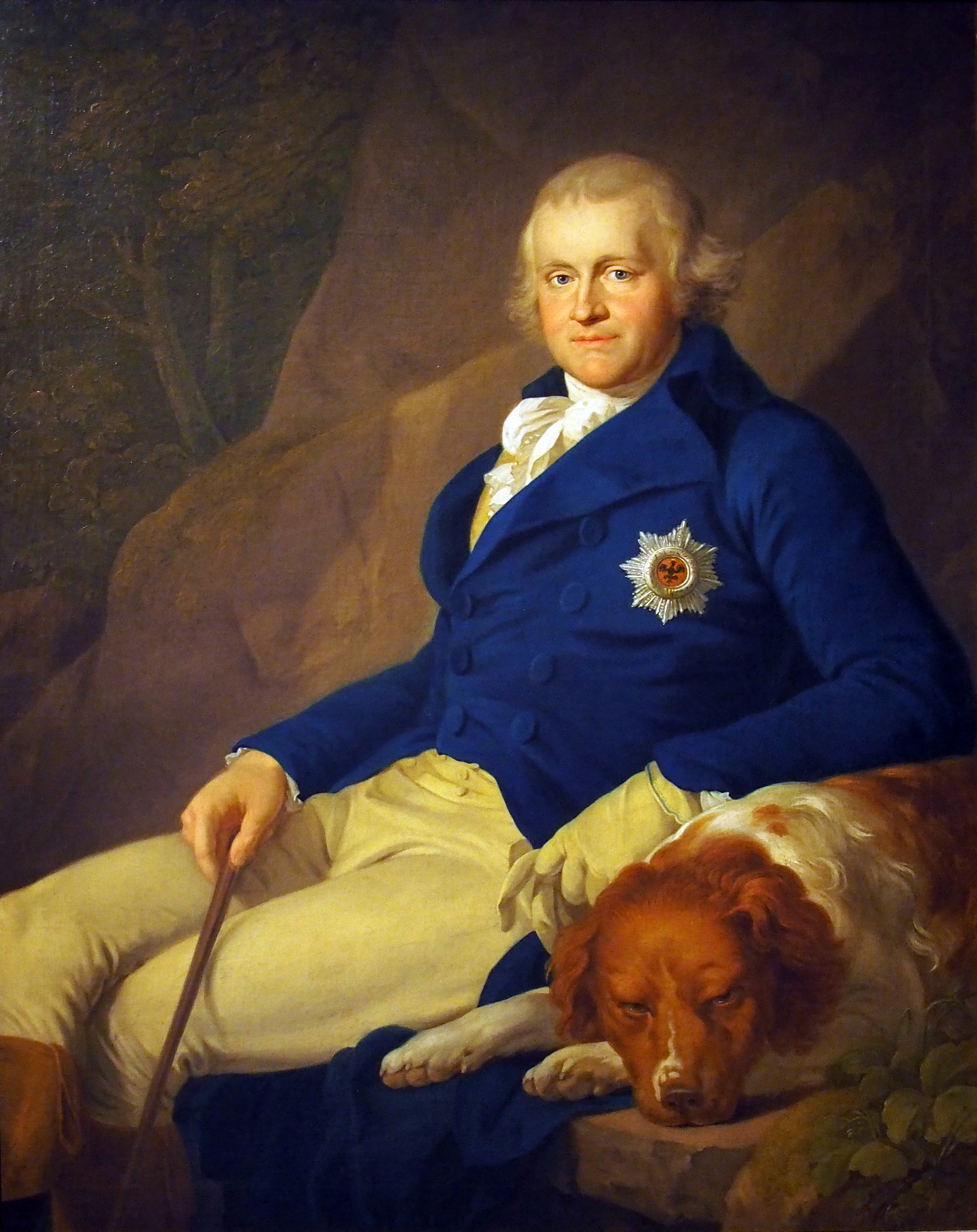
Karl August, Grand Duke of Saxe-Weimar-Eisenach in 1805 by Georg Melchior Kraus

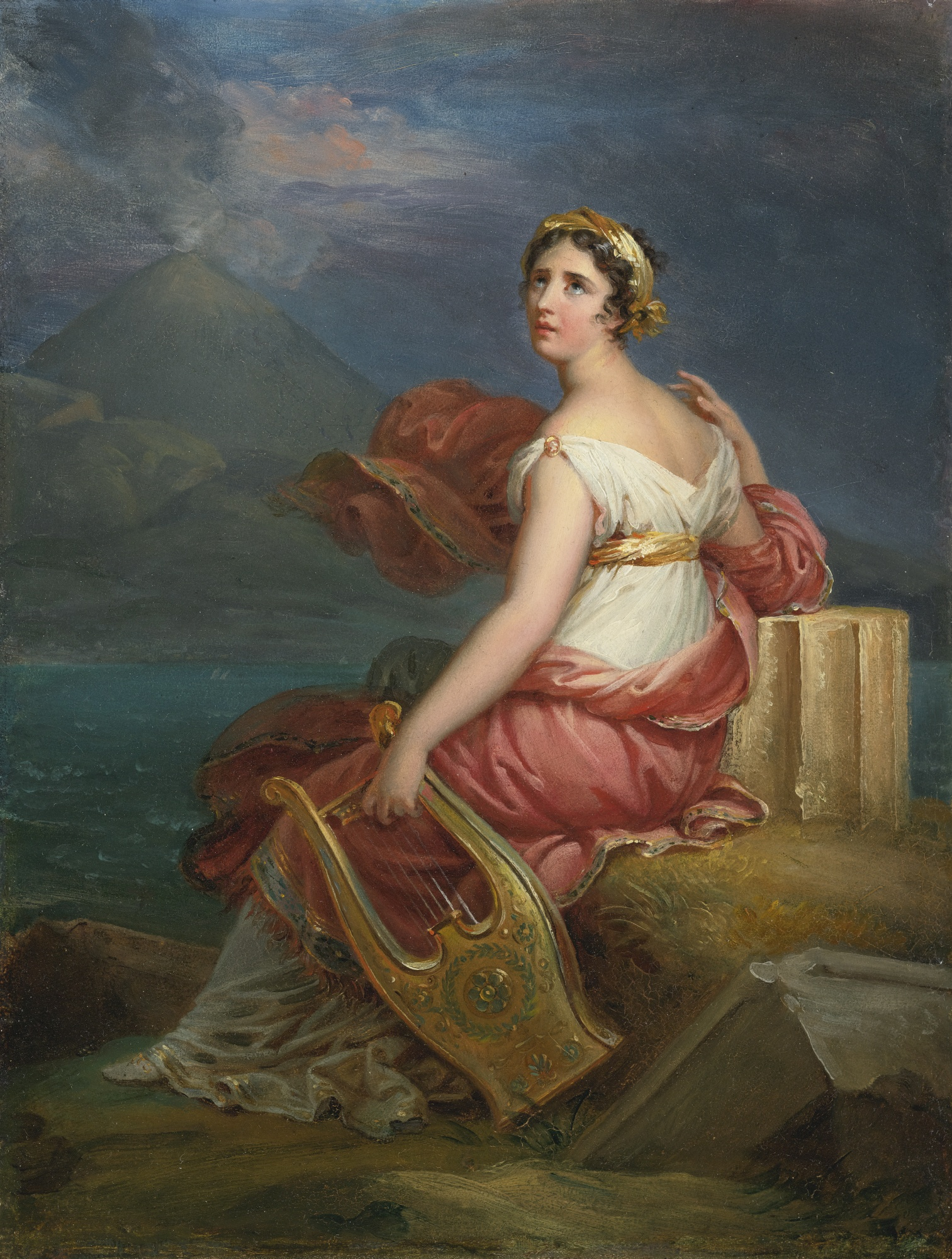
Madame de Staël as her character Corinne (posthumously) by François Gérard

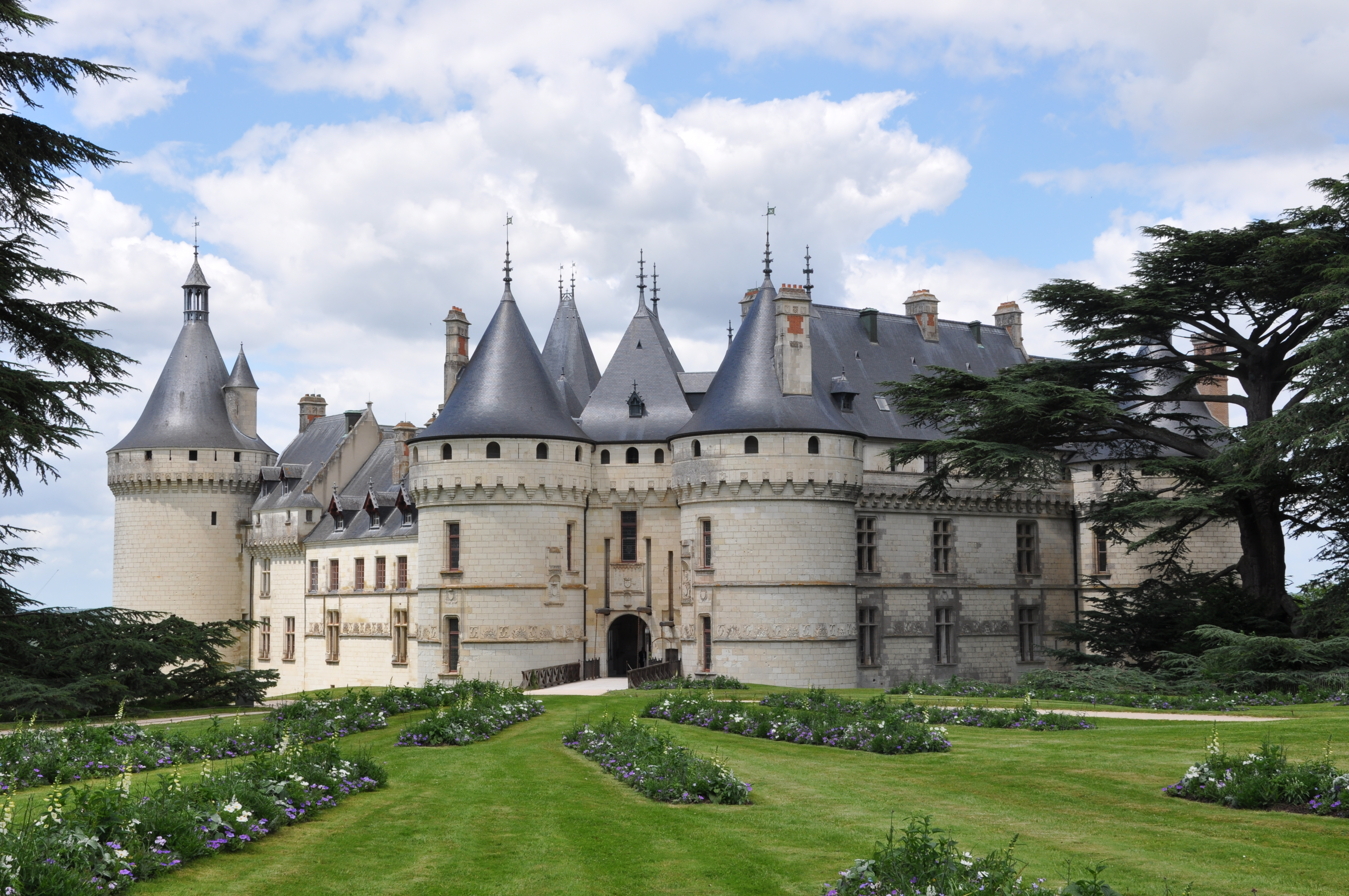
Château de Chaumont

With her children and Constant, de Staël stopped off in Metz and met Kant's French translator Charles de Villers. In mid-December, they arrived in Weimar, where she stayed for two and a half months at the court of the Grand Duke of Saxe-Weimar-Eisenach and his mother Anna Amalia. Goethe who had become ill hesitated about seeing her. After meeting her, Goethe went on to refer to her as an "extraordinary woman" in his private correspondence. Schiller complimented her intelligence and eloquence, but her frequent visits distracted him from completing William Tell. De Staël was constantly on the move, talking and asking questions. Constant decided to abandon her in Leipzig and return to Switzerland. De Staël travelled on to Berlin, where she made the acquaintance of August Schlegel who was lecturing there on literature. She appointed him on an enormous salary to tutor her children. On 18 April they all left Berlin when the news of her father's death reached her.

=== Mistress of Coppet ===
On 19 May, de Staël arrived in Coppet now its wealthy and independent mistress. She spent the summer at the chateau sorting through his writings and published an essay on his private life. In April 1804, Friedrich Schlegel married Dorothea Veit in the Swedish embassy. In July Constant wrote about de Staël, "She exerts over everything around her a kind of inexplicable but real power. If only she could govern herself, she might have governed the world." In December 1804 she travelled to Italy, accompanied by her children, August Wilhelm Schlegel, and the historian Sismondi. There she met the poet Monti and the painter, Angelica Kauffman. "Her visit to Italy helped her to develop her theory of the difference between northern and southern societies..."

De Staël returned to Coppet in June 1805, moved to Meulan (Château d'Acosta), and spent nearly a year writing her next book on Italy's culture and history. In Corinne ou l'Italie (1807), her own impressions of a sentimental and intellectual journey, the heroine appears to have been inspired by the Italian poet Diodata Saluzzo Roero. The book tells the story of two lovers: Corinne, the Italian poet, and Lord Nelvil, the English noble, travelling through Italy on a journey in part mirroring Staël's own travels. (Staël appears to have identified with her character, and there are several portraits of Staël represented as Corinne.) She combined romance with travelogue, showed all of Italy's works of art still in place, rather than plundered by Napoleon and taken to France. The book's publication acted as a reminder of her existence, and Napoleon sent her back to Coppet. Her house became, according to Stendhal, "the general headquarters of European thought" and was a debating club hostile to Napoleon, "turning conquered Europe into a parody of a feudal empire, with his own relatives in the roles of vassal states". Madame Récamier, also banned by Napoleon, Prince Augustus of Prussia, Charles Victor de Bonstetten, and Chateaubriand all belonged to the "Coppet group". Each day the table was laid for about thirty guests. Talking seemed to be everybody's chief activity.

For a time de Staël lived with Constant in Auxerre (1806), Rouen (1807), Aubergenville (1807). Then she met Friedrich Schlegel, whose wife Dorothea had translated Corinne into German. The use of the word Romanticism was invented by Schlegel but spread more widely across France through its persistent use by de Staël. Late in 1807 she set out for Vienna and visited Maurice O'Donnell. She was accompanied by her children and August Schlegel who gave his famous lectures there. In 1808 Benjamin Constant was afraid to admit to her that he had married Charlotte von Hardenberg in the meantime. "If men had the qualities of women", de Staël wrote, "love would simply cease to be a problem." De Staël set to work on her book about Germany – in which she presented the idea of a state called "Germany" as a model of ethics and aesthetics and praised German literature and philosophy. The exchange of ideas and literary and philosophical conversations with Goethe, Schiller, and Wieland had inspired de Staël to write one of the most influential books of the nineteenth century on Germany.

=== Return to France ===
Pretending she wanted to emigrate to the United States, de Staël was given permission to re-enter France. She moved first into the Château de Chaumont (1810), then relocated to Fossé and Vendôme. She was determined to publish De l'Allemagne in France, a multi-volume book about German culture and in particular the growing movement of German Romanticism. The book was considered "dangerous" by Napoleon as it favorably presented "new and foreign ideas" that challenged existing French political structures. Constrained by censorship, she wrote to the emperor a letter of complaint. The minister of police Savary had emphatically forbidden her to publish her "un-French" book. In 1810, after de Staël had successfully published her book in France, Napoleon ordered the destruction of all 10,000 copies. In October of the same year, she was exiled again and had to leave France within three days. August Schlegel was also ordered to leave the Swiss Confederation as an enemy of French literature. De Staël found consolation in a wounded veteran officer named Albert de Rocca, twenty-three years her junior, to whom she got privately engaged in 1811 but did not marry publicly until 1816.

=== East European travels ===
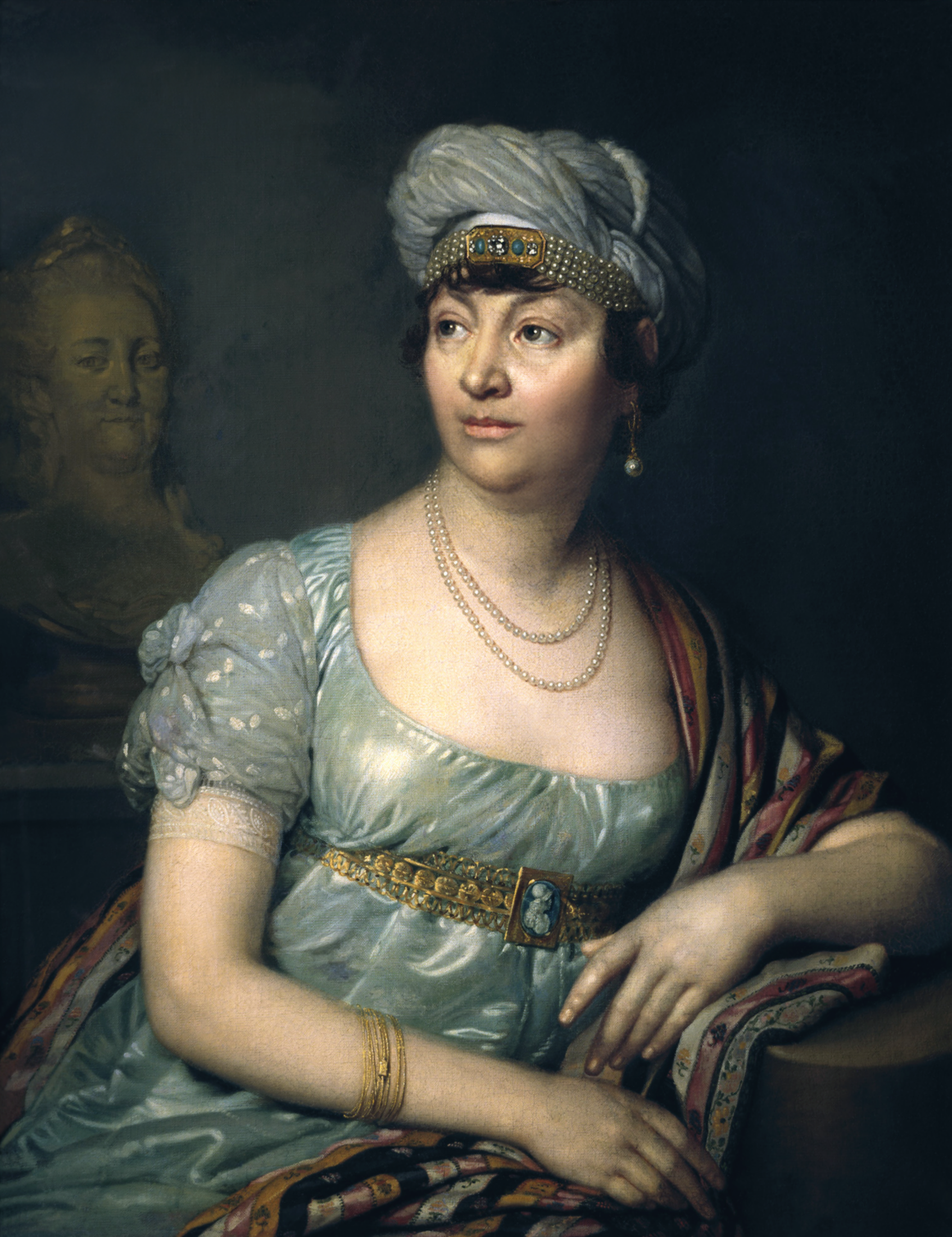
Madame de Staël in 1812 by Vladimir Borovikovsky

The operations of the French imperial police in the case of de Staël are rather obscure. She was at first left undisturbed, but by degrees, the chateau itself became a source of suspicion, and her visitors found themselves heavily persecuted. François-Emmanuel Guignard, De Montmorency and Mme Récamier were exiled for the crime of visiting her. She remained at home during the winter of 1811, planning to escape to England or Sweden with the manuscript. On 23 May 1812, she left Coppet under the pretext of a short outing, but journeyed through Bern, Innsbruck and Salzburg to Vienna, where she met Metternich. There, after some trepidation and trouble, she received the necessary passports to go on to Russia.

During Napoleon's invasion of Russia, de Staël, her two children, and Schlegel travelled through Galicia in the Habsburg empire from Brno to Łańcut where de Rocca, having deserted the French army and having been searched by the French gendarmerie, was waiting for her. The journey continued to Lemberg. On 14 July 1812 they arrived in Volhynia. In the meantime, Napoleon, who took a more northern route, had crossed the Niemen River with his army. In Kyiv, she met Miloradovich, governor of the city. De Staël hesitated to travel on to Odessa, Constantinople, and decided instead to go north. Perhaps she was informed of the outbreak of plague in the Ottoman Empire. In Moscow, she was invited by the governor Fyodor Rostopchin. According to de Staël, it was Rostopchin who ordered his mansion in Italian style near Winkovo to be set on fire. She left only a few weeks before Napoleon arrived there. Until 7 September, her party stayed in Saint Petersburg. According to John Quincy Adams, the American ambassador in Russia, her sentiments appeared to be as much the result of personal resentment against Bonaparte as of her general views of public affairs. She complained that he would not let her live in peace anywhere, merely because she had not praised him in her works. She met twice with the tsar Alexander I of Russia who "related to me also the lessons a la Machiavelli which Napoleon had thought proper to give him."

"You see," said he, "I am careful to keep my ministers and generals at variance among themselves, in order that each may reveal to me the faults of the other; I keep up a continual jealousy by the manner I treat those who care about me: one day one thinks himself the favourite, the next day another, so that no one is ever certain of my favour."

For de Staël, that was a vulgar and vicious theory. General Kutuzov sent her letters from the Battle of Tarutino; before the end of that year he succeeded, aided by the extreme weather, in chasing the Grande Armée out of Russia.

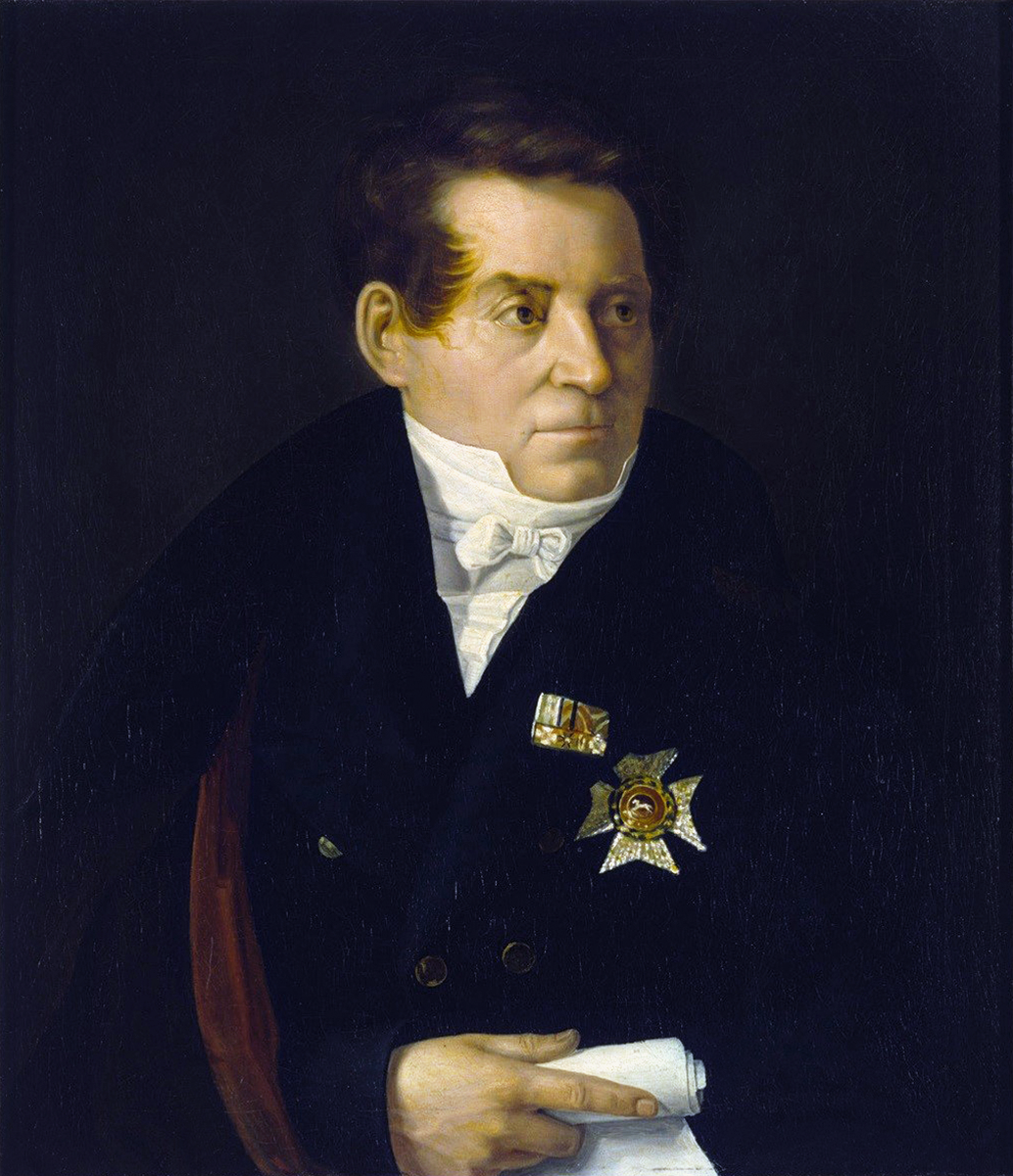
August Wilhelm von Schlegel by Adolf Hohneck

After four months of travel, de Staël arrived in Sweden. In 1811, she began writing her "Ten Years' Exile", detailing her travels and encounters. She travelled to Stockholm the following year, and continued work there. She did not finish the manuscript and after eight months, she set out for England, without August Schlegel, who meanwhile had been appointed secretary to the Crown Prince Carl Johan, formerly French Marshal Jean Baptiste Bernadotte (She supported Bernadotte as the new ruler of France, as she hoped he would introduce a constitutional monarchy). In London she received a great welcome. She met Lord Byron, William Wilberforce, the abolitionist, and Sir Humphry Davy, the chemist and inventor. According to Byron, "She preached English politics to the first of our English Whig politicians ... preached politics no less to our Tory politicians the day after." In March 1814 she invited Wilberforce for dinner and devoted the remaining years of her life to the fight for the abolition of the slave trade. Her stay was severely marred by the death of her son Albert, who as a member of the Swedish army had fallen in a duel with a Cossack officer in Doberan as a result of a gambling dispute. In October John Murray published De l'Allemagne both in French and English translation, in which she reflected on nationalism and suggested a re-consideration of cultural rather than natural boundaries. In May 1814, after Louis XVIII had been crowned (Bourbon Restoration) she returned to Paris. She wrote her Considérations sur la révolution française, based on Part One of "Ten Years' Exile". Again her salon became a major attraction both for Parisians and foreigners.

== Restoration and death ==
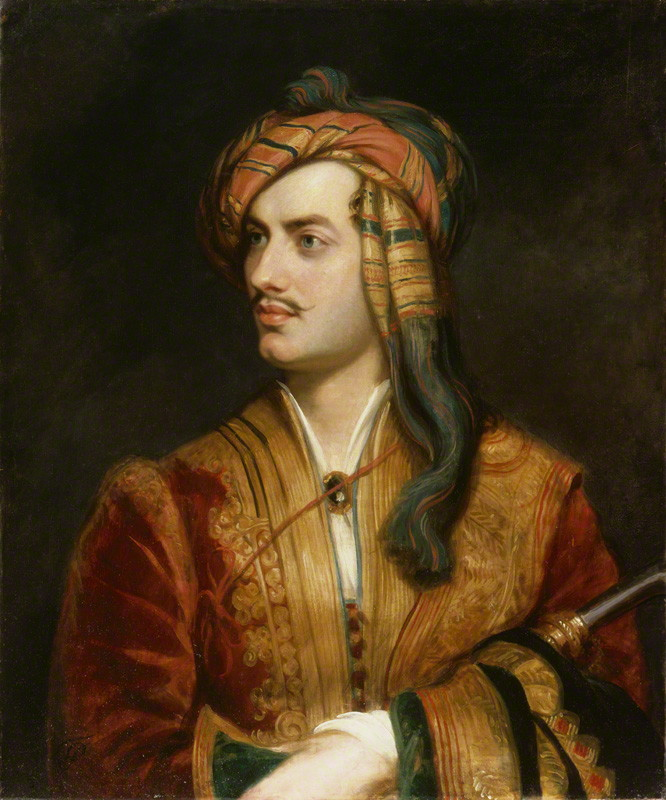
Lord Byron in Albanian Dress by Thomas Phillips, 1813

When news came of Napoleon's landing on the Côte d'Azur, between Cannes and Antibes, early in March 1815, de Staël fled again to Coppet, and never forgave Constant for approving of Napoleon's return. Although she had no affection for the Bourbons she succeeded in obtaining restitution for the huge loan Necker had made to the French state in 1778 before the Revolution (see above). In October, after the Battle of Waterloo, she set out for Italy, not only for the sake of her own health but for that of her second husband, de Rocca, who was suffering from tuberculosis. In May her 19-year-old daughter Albertine married Victor, 3rd duc de Broglie in Livorno.

The whole family returned to Coppet in June. Lord Byron, at that time in debt, left London in great trouble and frequently visited de Staël during July and August. For Byron, she was Europe's greatest living writer, but "with her pen behind her ears and her mouth full of ink". "Byron was particularly critical of de Staël's self-dramatizing tendencies". Byron was a supporter of Napoleon, but for de Staël Bonaparte "was not only a talented man but also one who represented a whole pernicious system of power", a system that "ought to be examined as a great political problem relevant to many generations." "Napoleon imposed standards of homogeneity on Europe that is, French taste in literature, art and the legal systems, all of which de Staël saw as inimical to her cosmopolitan point of view." Byron wrote she was "sometimes right and often wrong about Italy and England – but almost always true in delineating the heart, which is of but one nation of no country, or rather, of all."

Despite her increasingly ill health, de Staël returned to Paris for the winter of 1816–17, living at 40, rue des Mathurins. Constant argued with de Staël, who had asked him to pay off his debts to her. A warm friendship sprang up between de Staël and the Duke of Wellington, whom she had first met in 1814, and she used her influence with him to have the size of the Army of Occupation greatly reduced.

De Staël became confined to her house, paralyzed since 21 February 1817 following a stroke. She died on 14 July 1817. Wellington remarked that, while he knew that she was greatly afraid of death, he had thought her incapable of believing in the afterlife. Wellington makes no mention of de Staël reading Thomas à Kempis in the quote found in Elizabeth Longford's biography of the Iron Duke. Furthermore, he reports hearsay, which may explain why two modern biographies of de Staël – Herold and Fairweather – discount the conversion entirely. Herold states that "her last deed in life was to reaffirm in her 'Considerations, her faith in Enlightenment, freedom, and progress'." Rocca survived her by little more than six months. The first edition of her complete works was published by his son with the publishing house Treuttel & Würtz in 1820-1821.

== Offspring ==
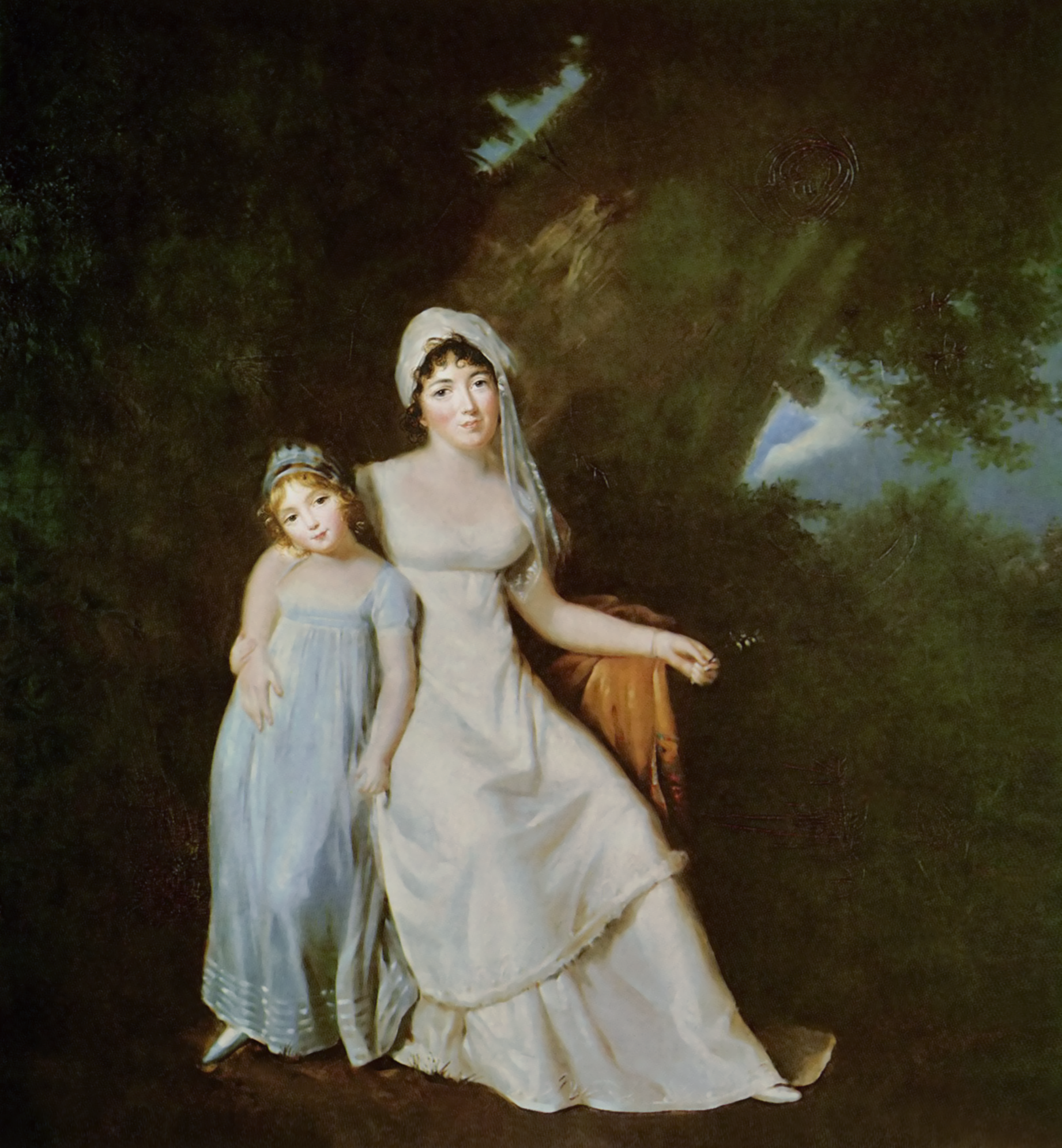
Madame de Staël and her daughter Albertine by Marguerite Gérard

In total, Madame de Staël had six children, who were all acknowledged by her husband (except her last son, who was born after his death). In all likelihood, only the first two children were actually fathered by Erik de Staël-Holstein:

1. Gustavine Sophie Madeleine de Staël-Holstein (July 1787), died in infancy.
2. Gustava Hedwig de Staël-Holstein (August 1789), died in infancy.

It is believed Louis, Comte de Narbonne-Lara (himself a reputed unacknowledged illegitimate child of Louis XV), fathered her next two sons:

3. Louis Auguste de Staël-Holstein (1 September 1790 - 11 November 1827), an abolitionist.

4. Mattias Albert de Staël-Holstein (2 October 1792 - 12 July 1813), killed in a duel in Mecklenburg.

It is believed that Benjamin Constant was the biological father of her daughter:

5. Albertine Ida Gustavine de Staël-Holstein (8 June 1797 - 22 September 1838), who married Victor, Duc de Broglie.

With her second husband, Albert de Rocca, de Staël then aged 46, had one disabled son:

6. Théodore Gilles Louis Alphonse de Rocca (7 April 1812 - 12 November 1842), who married Marie-Louise-Antoinette de Rambuteau, daughter of Claude-Philibert Barthelot de Rambuteau, and granddaughter of De Narbonne.

Even as she gave birth, there were fifteen people in her bedroom.

After the death of de Staël's husband, Mathieu de Montmorency became the legal guardian of her children. Like August Schlegel he was one of her intimates until the end of her life.

== Legacy ==
Albertine Necker de Saussure, married to de Staël's cousin, wrote her biography in 1821 and published it as part of the collected works. Auguste Comte included Mme de Staël in his 1849 Calendar of Great Men. "In one version of the calendar, the 24th day of the month of Dante is dedicated to Madame de Staël, who finds herself among such poets as Milton, Cervantes, and Chaucer. In another version, Staël finds herself honoured, instead, on the 19th day of the tenth month, known as "Shakespeare," among the likes of Goethe, Racine, Voltaire, and Madame de Sevigné." Her political legacy has been generally identified with a stout defence of "liberal" values: equality, individual freedom, and the limitation of state power by constitutional rules. "Yet although she insisted to the Duke of Wellington that she needed politics in order to live, her attitude towards the propriety of female political engagement varied: at times she declared that women should simply be the guardians of domestic space for the opposite sex, while at others, that denying women access to the public sphere of activism and engagement was an abuse of human rights. This paradox partly explains the persona of the "homme-femme" she presented in society, and it remained unresolved throughout her life."

Comte's disciple Frederic Harrison wrote about de Staël that her novels "precede the works of Walter Scott, Byron, Mary Shelley, and partly those of Chateaubriand, their historical importance is great in the development of modern Romanticism, of the romance of the heart, the delight in nature, and in the arts, antiquities, and history of Europe."

=== Precursor of feminism ===
Recent studies by historians, including feminists, have been assessing the specifically feminine dimension in de Staël's contributions both as an activist-theorist and as a writer about the tumultuous events of her time. Some scholars call her a precursor of feminism. Staël had a robust theory of female liberation. At the time that Staël was writing, in the peak years of the French Revolution, early French feminism was animated over the issue of legal and political equality for the sexes. At the advent of the French Revolution in 1789, the image of a traditional homemaking woman had given way to a more militant feminist approach found in pamphlets that circulated in France at the time. In this sea of tumultuous events, Staël's use of the novel and more implicit methods to communicate her beliefs about the Revolution and gender equality, coupled with her social status, aided in ensuring her endurance on the political and literary scene. Staël's extensive set of writings, from her correspondence with lovers to her philosophy to her fiction, betray not just the tension between intellectual and romantic fulfillment but also between feminist political equality and romantic fulfillment. Her work indicates that she finds her two desires, personal freedom and emotional intimacy, to be diametrically opposed in practice, especially in post-Revolutionary French society. In particular, she deplored that men took the central roles in Enlightenment philosophy and politics, neither of which included avenues for women's direct participation.

=== Abolition ===
Staël was a strong advocate for the abolition of slavery in the French colonies. In her later years, her salon was frequented by abolitionists, and emancipation was a recurring topic of their discussions. After meeting the famous abolitionist William Wilberforce in 1814, Staël published a preface for his essay on the slave trade in which she called for the end of slavery in Europe. In that text, Staël argued in particular against those who defended slavery on the grounds that the economic impact of abandoning the slave trade would be too grave:

"When it is proposed that some abuse of power be eliminated, those who benefit from that abuse are certain to declare that all the benefits of the social order are attached to it. 'This is the keystone,' they say, while it is only the keystone to their own advantages; and when at last the progress of enlightenment brings about the long-desired reform, they are astonished at the improvements which result from it. Good sends out its roots everywhere; equilibrium is effortlessly restored; and truth heals the ills of the human species, as does nature, without anyone's intervention." (Kadish and Massardier-Kenney 2009, 169)

Staël argues here that the claim that abolition would have "dire consequences" for the French economy is nothing but an illusory threat used by those who benefit from the institution of slavery (Kadish and Massardier-Kenney 2009, 169). Staël believed that the termination of the slave trade would improve France and bring about a positive consequence that 'sends out its roots everywhere.'

=== Letters to Jefferson ===
In 1807, Jacques Le Ray de Chaumont sent Jefferson a copy of Corinne, and also conveyed to Staël Jefferson's first letter addressed to her. This marked the beginning of a series of eight letters between the two, the last of which was sent from Staël to Jefferson shortly before her death in 1817.

The correspondence between Staël and Jefferson sheds light upon the fascinating relationship between two momentous figures, covering the personal (such as Staël's son Auguste's desire to visit the United States to "make a pilgrimage toward reason and freedom") and the global (the War of 1812 is the pressing topic, and there is even an interlude where Jefferson details the state of South American geopolitics, replete with a map).

Famously, in 1816, in a letter to Thomas Jefferson, Staël writes, "If one succeeds in destroying slavery in the South, at least one government in the world will be as perfect as human reason can possibly conceive." Although this is generally understood by scholars to be a criticism of slavery in the southern states of the United States, due to ambiguity in translating the word "south" from the original French, other scholars have suggested that de Staël could be referring to colonization in South America.

=== Staël and the Adams family ===
The Adams family (including former American presidents John Adams and John Quincy Adams and former First Lady Abigail Adams) was an important political family in the U.S during the 18th and early 20th century. Staël was a frequent topic of discussion amongst the Adams. John Quincy Adams, the 6th U.S president, in particular, recommended and sent many copies of Staël's works to his father, John Adams; mother, Abigail Adams; and wife, Louisa Catherine Adams. In letters written between the end of the 18th century and beginning of the 19th century, these members of the Adams family discussed Delphine, A Treatise on the Influence of the Passions, Upon the Happiness of Individuals and of Nations, and The Reflections Upon Peace.

== In popular culture ==
- Republican activist Victor Gold quoted Madame de Staël when characterizing American Vice President Dick Cheney, "Men do not change, they unmask themselves."
- De Staël is credited in Tolstoy's epilogue to War and Peace as a factor of the 'influential forces' which historians say led to the movement of humanity in that era.
- The popular wrestling compilation series Botchamania has referenced her on several occasions saying One must choose in life, between boredom and suffering which is normally followed by a humorous joke.
- On the popular HBO television show, The Sopranos, character Meadow Soprano quotes Madame de Staël in Season 2, Episode 7, D-Girl, when she says, "Madame de Staël said, 'In life one must choose between boredom or suffering.'"
- Mme de Staël is used several times to characterize Mme de Grandet in Stendhal's Lucien Leuwen.
- Mme de Staël is mentioned several times, always approvingly, by Russia's national poet, Alexander Pushkin. He described her in 1825 as a woman whose persecution distinguished her and who commanded respect from all of Europe, and gave her a positive portrayal in his unfinished 1836 novel Roslavlev. Her high stature in Russia is attested by Pushkin's warning to a critic: "Mme de Staël is ours, do not touch her!"
- Pushkin's friend Pyotr Vyazemsky was also an admirer of her life and works.
- Mme de Staël is frequently quoted by Ralph Waldo Emerson and she is credited with introducing him to recent German thought.
- Herman Melville considered de Staël among the greatest women of the century and Margaret Fuller consciously adopted de Staël as her role model.
- Danish radical Georg Brandes gave pride of place to de Staël in his survey of Emigrantlitteraturen and highly esteemed her novels, particularly Corinne, which was also admired by Henrik Ibsen and used as a guidebook for his travels through Italy.
- Talleyrand observed with his customary cynicism that Germaine enjoyed throwing people overboard simply to have the pleasure of fishing them out of the water again.
- Sismondi accused De Staël of a lack of tact, when they were travelling through Italy and wrote Mme De Staël was easily bored if she had to pay attention to things.
- For Heinrich Heine she was the "grandmother of doctrines".
- For Byron she was "a good woman at heart and the cleverest at bottom, but spoilt by a wish to be – she knew not what. In her own house she was amiable; in any other person's, you wished her gone, and in her own again".

== Works ==
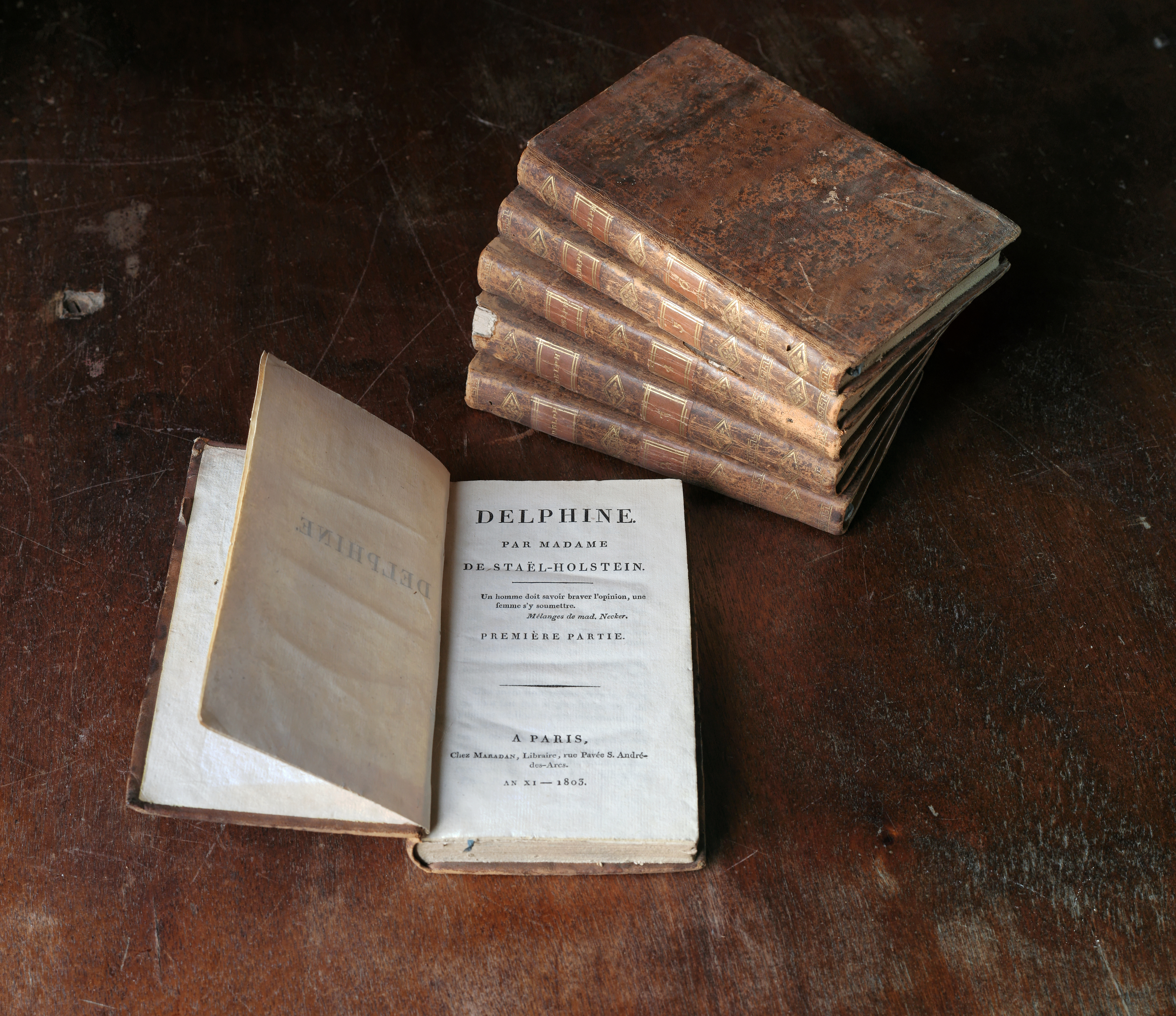
Delphine, 1803 edition.

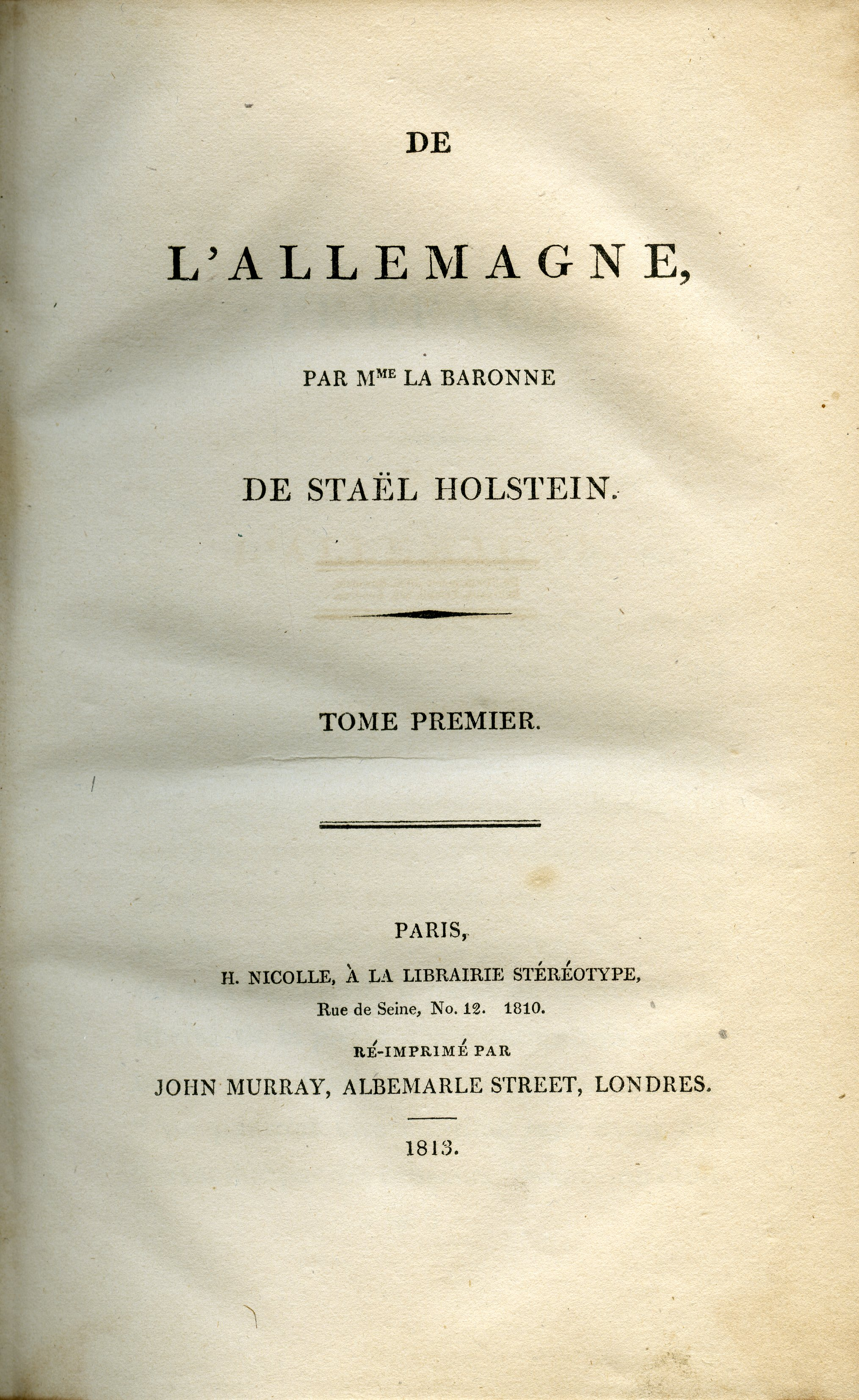
De l'Allemagne, 1813 edition.

- Journal de Jeunesse, 1785
- Sophie ou les sentiments secrets, 1786 (published anonymously in 1790)
- Jane Gray, 1787 (published in 1790)
- Lettres sur le caractère et les écrits de J.-J. Rousseau, 1788
- Éloge de M. de Guibert
- À quels signes peut-on reconnaître quelle est l'opinion de la majorité de la nation?
- Réflexions sur le procès de la Reine, 1793
- Zulma : fragment d'un ouvrage, 1794
- Réflexions sur la paix adressées à M. Pitt et aux Français, 1795
- Réflexions sur la paix intérieure
- Recueil de morceaux détachés (comprenant : Épître au malheur ou Adèle et Édouard, Essai sur les fictions et trois nouvelles : Mirza ou lettre d'un voyageur, Adélaïde et Théodore et Histoire de Pauline), 1795
- Essai sur les fictions, translated by Goethe into German
- De l'influence des passions sur le bonheur des individus et des nations, 1796
- Des circonstances actuelles qui peuvent terminer la Révolution et des principes qui doivent fonder la République en France
- De la littérature dans ses rapports avec les institutions sociales, 1799
- Delphine, 1802 deals with the question of woman's status in a society hidebound by convention and faced with a Revolutionary new order
- Vie privée de Mr. Necker, 1804
- Épîtres sur Naples
- Corinne ou l'Italie, 1807 is as much a travelogue as a fictional narrative. It discusses the problems of female artistic creativity in two radically different cultures, England and Italy.
- Agar dans le désert
- Geneviève de Brabant
- La Sunamite
- Le capitaine Kernadec ou sept années en un jour (comédie en deux actes et en prose)
- La signora Fantastici
- Le mannequin (comédie)
- Sapho
- De l'Allemagne, 1813, translated as Germany 1813.
- Réflexions sur le suicide, 1813
- Morgan et trois nouvelles, 1813
- An appeal to the nations of Europe against the continental system: published at Stockholm, by authority of Bernadotte, in March 1813. By Madame de Staël Holstein.
- De l'esprit des traductions
- Considérations sur les principaux événements de la révolution française, depuis son origine jusques et compris le 8 juillet 1815, 1818 (posthumously)
- Dix Années d'Exil (1818), posthumously published in France by Mdm Necker de Saussure. In 1821 translated and published as Ten Years' Exile. Memoirs of That Interesting Period of the Life of the Baroness De Stael-Holstein, Written by Herself, during the Years 1810, 1811, 1812, and 1813, and Now First Published from the Original Manuscript, by Her Son.
- Essais dramatiques, 1821
- Oeuvres complètes 17 t., 1820–21
- Oeuvres complètes de Madame la Baronne de Staël-Holstein [Complete works of Madame Baron de Staël-Holstein]. Paris: Firmin Didot frères. 1836. Volume 1 · Volume 2

=== Correspondence in French ===
- Lettres de Madame de Staël à Madame de Récamier, première édition intégrale, présentées et annotées par Emmanuel Beau de Loménie, éditions Domat, Paris, 1952.
- Lettres sur les écrits et le caractère de J.-J. Rousseau. – De l'influence des passions sur le bonheur des individus et des nations. – De l'éducation de l'âme par la vie./Réflexions sur le suicide. – Sous la direction de Florence Lotterie. Textes établis et présentés par Florence Lotterie. Annotation par Anne Amend Söchting, Anne Brousteau, Florence Lotterie, Laurence Vanoflen. 2008. ISBN 978-2745316424.
- Correspondance générale. Texte établi et présenté par Béatrice W. Jasinski et Othenin d'Haussonville. Slatkine (Réimpression), 2008–2009.
  1. Volume I. 1777–1791. ISBN 978-2051020817.
  2. Volume II. 1792–1794. ISBN 978-2051020824.
  3. Volume III. 1794–1796. ISBN 978-2051020831.
  4. Volume IV. 1796–1803. ISBN 978-2051020848.
  5. Volume V. 1803–1805. ISBN 978-2051020855.
  6. Volume VI. 1805–1809. ISBN 978-2051020862.
  7. Volume VII. date:15 May 1809–23 May 1812. ISBN 978-2051020879.
- Madame de Staël ou l'intelligence politique. Sa pensée, ses amis, ses amants, ses ennemis…, textes de présentation et de liaison de Michel Aubouin, Omnibus, 2017. ISBN 978-2258142671 commentaire biblio, Lettres de Mme de Staël, extraits de ses textes politiques et de ses romans, textes et extraits de lettres de Chateaubriand, Talleyrand, Napoléon, Benjamin Constant. This edition contains extracts from her political writings and from letters addressed to her by Chateaubriand, Talleyrand, Napoleon and Benjamin Constant.

== Multilingual editions ==
- A short Account of Lady Jane Grey / Historische Nachricht über Lady Jane Grey / Notice sur Lady Jane Grey. Calambac Publishing House, Germany 2020, trilingual edition: English/German/French, ISBN 978-3-943117-10-3.

== See also ==
- Contributions to liberal theory
- Liberalism
- Women in the French Revolution
- Sophie Doin

== Sources ==
- Fontana, Biancamaria (2016). Germaine de Staël: A Political Portrait. Princeton: Princeton University Press. ISBN 978-0691169040.
- Goodden, Angelica (2008). Madame de Staël : the dangerous exile. Oxford University Press. ISBN 978-0199238095.
- Herold, J. Christopher (2002) [1958]. Mistress to an Age: A Life of Madame de Staël. Grove Press. ISBN 978-0802138378.
- Moore, L. (2007). Liberty. The Lives and Times of Six Women in Revolutionary France.
- Müller, Olaf (2008). "Madame de Staël und Weimar. Europäische Dimensionen einer Begegnung" (PDF). In Hellmut Th. Seemann (ed.). Europa in Weimar. Visionen eines Kontinents. Jahrbuch der Klassik Stiftung Weimar. Göttingen: Wallstein Verlag.
- Nicholson, Andrew, ed. (1991). Lord Byron: The Complete Miscellaneous Prose. Oxford: Clarendon Press. ISBN 978-0198185437.
- Schama, Simon (1989). Citizens: A Chronicle of the French Revolution. Random House. ISBN 0679-726101.
