= Coppet (disambiguation) =

Coppet is a municipality in the Swiss canton of Vaud. Coppet may also refer to:

- Coppet Castle, château in the municipality of Coppet
- Coppet railway station, railway station in the municipality of Coppet
- Coppet Hill, nature reserve in Herefordshire, England
- Jules Marcel de Coppet (1881–1968), French colonial administrator
- Stany Coppet (born 1976), French actor

== See also ==
- Coppet group, informal intellectual and literary gathering centred on Germaine de Staël, named for the castle
- Eileen de Coppet, Princess of Albania (1922–1985), Englishwoman who became Princess of Albania by marriage
- Coppett, Newfoundland and Labrador, town on the south coast of Newfoundland and Labrador
