= Salon (gathering) =

Social gathering

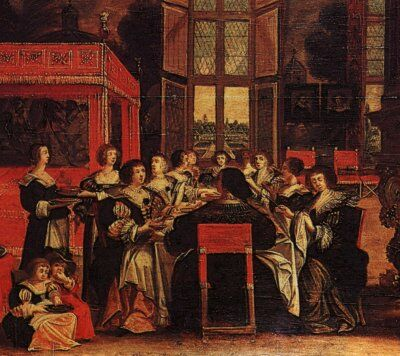
Réunion de dames, Abraham Bosse, 17th century

A salon is a gathering of people held by a host. These gatherings often consciously followed Horace's definition of the aims of poetry, "either to please or to educate" (Latin: aut delectare aut prodesse). Salons in the tradition of the French literary and philosophical movements of the 17th and 18th centuries are still being conducted.

== Historical background ==
The salon first appeared in Italy in the 16th century, then flourished in France throughout the 17th and 18th centuries. It continued to flourish in Italy throughout the 19th century. In 16th-century Italy, some brilliant circles formed in the smaller courts which resembled salons, often galvanized by the presence of a beautiful and educated patroness such as Isabella d'Este or Elisabetta Gonzaga.

Salons were an important place for the exchange of ideas. The word salon first appeared in France in 1664 (from the Italian salone, the large reception hall of Italian mansions; salone is actually the augmentative form of sala, room). Literary gatherings before this were often referred to by using the name of the room in which they occurred, like cabinet, réduit, ruelle, and alcôve. Before the end of the 17th century, these gatherings were frequently held in the bedroom (treated as a more private form of drawing room): a lady, reclining on her bed, would receive close friends who would sit on chairs or stools drawn around.

This practice may be contrasted with the greater formalities of Louis XIV's petit lever, where all stood. Ruelle, literally meaning "narrow street" or "lane", designates the space between a bed and the wall in a bedroom; it was used commonly to designate the gatherings of the "précieuses", the intellectual and literary circles that formed around women in the first half of the 17th century. The first renowned salon in France was the Hôtel de Rambouillet not far from the Palais du Louvre in Paris, which its hostess, Roman-born Catherine de Vivonne, marquise de Rambouillet (1588–1665), ran from 1607 until her death. She established the rules of etiquette of the salon which resembled the earlier codes of Italian chivalry.

In Britain, mathematician and inventor Charles Babbage is credited with introducing the scientific soirée, a form of salon, from France. Babbage began hosting Saturday evening soirées in 1828.

=== Historiography ===
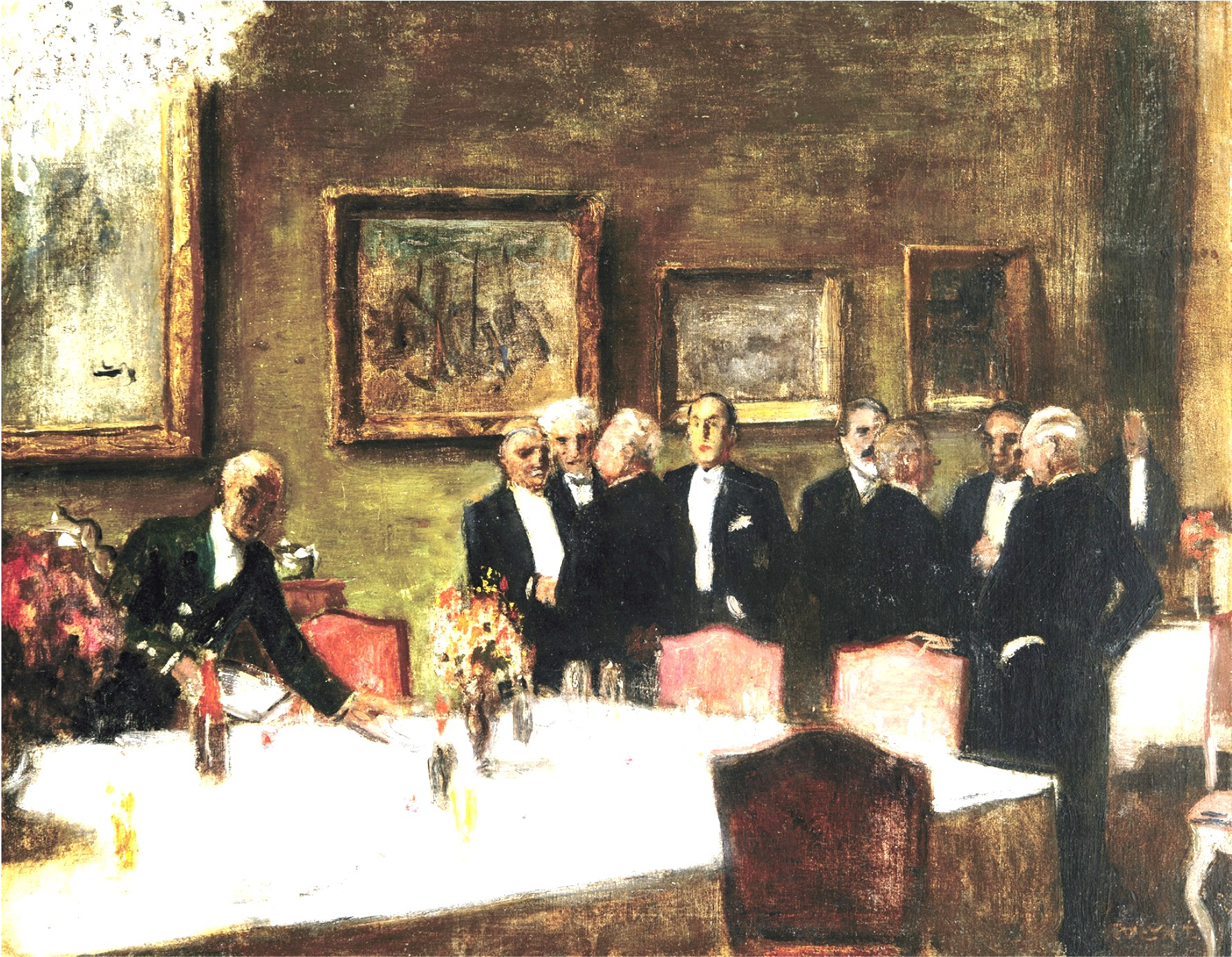
Fészek salon in the 1930s

The history of the salon is far from straightforward. The salon has been studied in depth by a mixture of feminist, Marxist, cultural, social, and intellectual historians. Each of these methodologies focuses on different aspects of the salon, and thus have varying analyses of its importance in terms of French history and the Enlightenment as a whole.

Major historiographical debates focus on the relationship between the salons and the public sphere, as well as the role played by women within the salons.

Breaking down the salons into historical periods is complicated due to the various historiographical debates that surround them. Most studies stretch from the early 16th century up until around the end of the 18th century. Goodman is typical in ending her study at the French Revolution where, she writes: 'the literary public sphere was transformed into the political public'. Steven Kale is relatively alone in his recent attempts to extend the period of the salon up until Revolution of 1848:

A whole world of social arrangements and attitude supported the existence of French salons: an idle aristocracy, an ambitious middle class, an active intellectual life, the social density of a major urban center, sociable traditions, and a certain aristocratic feminism. This world did not disappear in 1789.

In the 1920s, Gertrude Stein's Saturday evening salons (described in Ernest Hemingway's 1964 novel A Moveable Feast and depicted fictionally in Woody Allen's 2011 film Midnight in Paris) gained notoriety for including Pablo Picasso and other twentieth-century luminaries like Alice B. Toklas.

Her contemporary Natalie Clifford Barney's handmade dinner place setting is on display at The Brooklyn Museum. Like Stein, she was also an author and American ex-pat living in Paris at the time, hosting literary salons that were attended by Ernest Hemingway and F. Scott Fitzgerald as well. She bought a home with an old Masonic temple in the backyard which she dubbed Temple d'Amitié, the Temple of Friendship, for private meetings with attendees of her salons.

In 2018, Barnard College professor Caroline Weber's book Proust's Duchess: How Three Celebrated Women Captured the Imagination of Fin-de-Siècle Paris was shortlisted for the Pulitzer Prize and was the first in-depth study of the three Parisian salon hostesses Proust used to create his supreme fictional character, the Duchesse de Guermantes.

== Conversation, content, and form ==
Contemporary literature about the salons is dominated by idealistic notions of politeness, civility, and honesty, though it is debated whether they lived up to these standards. These older texts tend to portray reasoned debates and egalitarian polite conversation. Dena Goodman contends that, rather than being leisure-based or "schools of civilité", salons were at "the very heart of the philosophic community" and thus integral to the process of Enlightenment. In short, Goodman argues, the 17th and 18th century saw the emergence of the academic, Enlightenment salons, which came out of the aristocratic "schools of civilité". Politeness, argues Goodman, took second place to academic discussion.

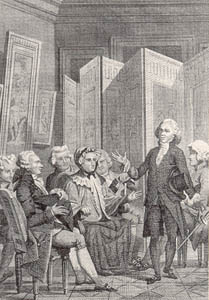
"Abbé Delille reciting his poem, La Conversation in the salon of Madame Geoffrin" from Jacques Delille, "La Conversation" (Paris, 1812)

The period in which salons were dominant has been labeled the "age of conversation". The topics of conversation within the salons – that is, what was and was not "polite" to talk about – are thus vital when trying to determine the form of the salons. The salonnières were expected, ideally, to run and moderate the conversation (See Women in the salon). There is, however, no universal agreement among historians as to what was and was not appropriate conversation. Marcel Proust "insisted that politics was scrupulously avoided". Others suggested that little other than government was ever discussed. The disagreements that surround the content of discussion partly explain why the salon's relationship with the public sphere is so heavily contested. Individuals and collections of individuals that have been of cultural significance overwhelmingly cite some form of engaged, explorative conversation regularly held with an esteemed group of acquaintances as the source of inspiration for their contributions to culture, art, literature and politics, leading some scholars to posit the salon's influence on the public sphere as being more widespread than previously appreciated.

=== Relationship with the public sphere ===
Recent historiography has been dominated by Jürgen Habermas' work, The Structural Transformation of the Public Sphere (triggered largely by its translation into French in 1978, and then English in 1989), which argued that the salons were of great historical importance. Theaters of conversation and exchange – such as the salons and the coffeehouses in England – played a critical role in the emergence of what Habermas termed the public sphere, which emerged in cultural-political contrast to court society. Thus, while women retained a dominant role in the historiography of the salons, the salons received increasing amounts of study, much of it in direct response to or heavily influenced by Habermas' theory.

The most prominent defense of salons as part of the public sphere comes from Dena Goodman's The Republic of Letters, which claims that the "public sphere was structured by the salon, the press and other institutions of sociability". Goodman's work is also credited with further emphasizing the importance of the salon in terms of French history, the Republic of Letters and the Enlightenment as a whole, and has dominated the historiography of the salons since its publication in 1994.

Habermas' dominance in salon historiography has come under criticism from some quarters, with Pekacz singling out Goodman's Republic of Letters for particular criticism because it was written with "the explicit intention of supporting [Habermas'] thesis", rather than verifying it. The theory itself, meanwhile, has been criticized for a fatal misunderstanding of the nature of salons. The main criticism of Habermas' interpretation of the salons, however, is that the salons of most influence were not part of an oppositional public sphere, and were instead an extension of court society.

This criticism stems largely from Norbert Elias' The History of Manners, in which Elias contends that the dominant concepts of the salons – politesse, civilité and honnêteté – were "used almost as synonyms, by which the courtly people wished to designate, in a broad or narrow sense, the quality of their own behavior'. Joan Landes agrees, stating that, "to some extent, the salon was merely an extension of the institutionalized court" and that rather than being part of the public sphere, salons were in fact in conflict with it. Erica Harth concurs, pointing to the fact that the state "appropriated the informal academy and not the salon" due to the academies' "tradition of dissent" – something that lacked in the salon. But Landes' view of the salons as a whole is independent of both Elias' and Habermas' school of thought, insofar that she views the salons as a "unique institution" that cannot be adequately described as part of the public sphere or court society. Others, such as Steven Kale, compromise by declaring that the public and private spheres overlapped in the salons. Antoine Lilti ascribes to a similar viewpoint, describing the salons as simply "institutions within Parisian high society".

=== Salonnières ===
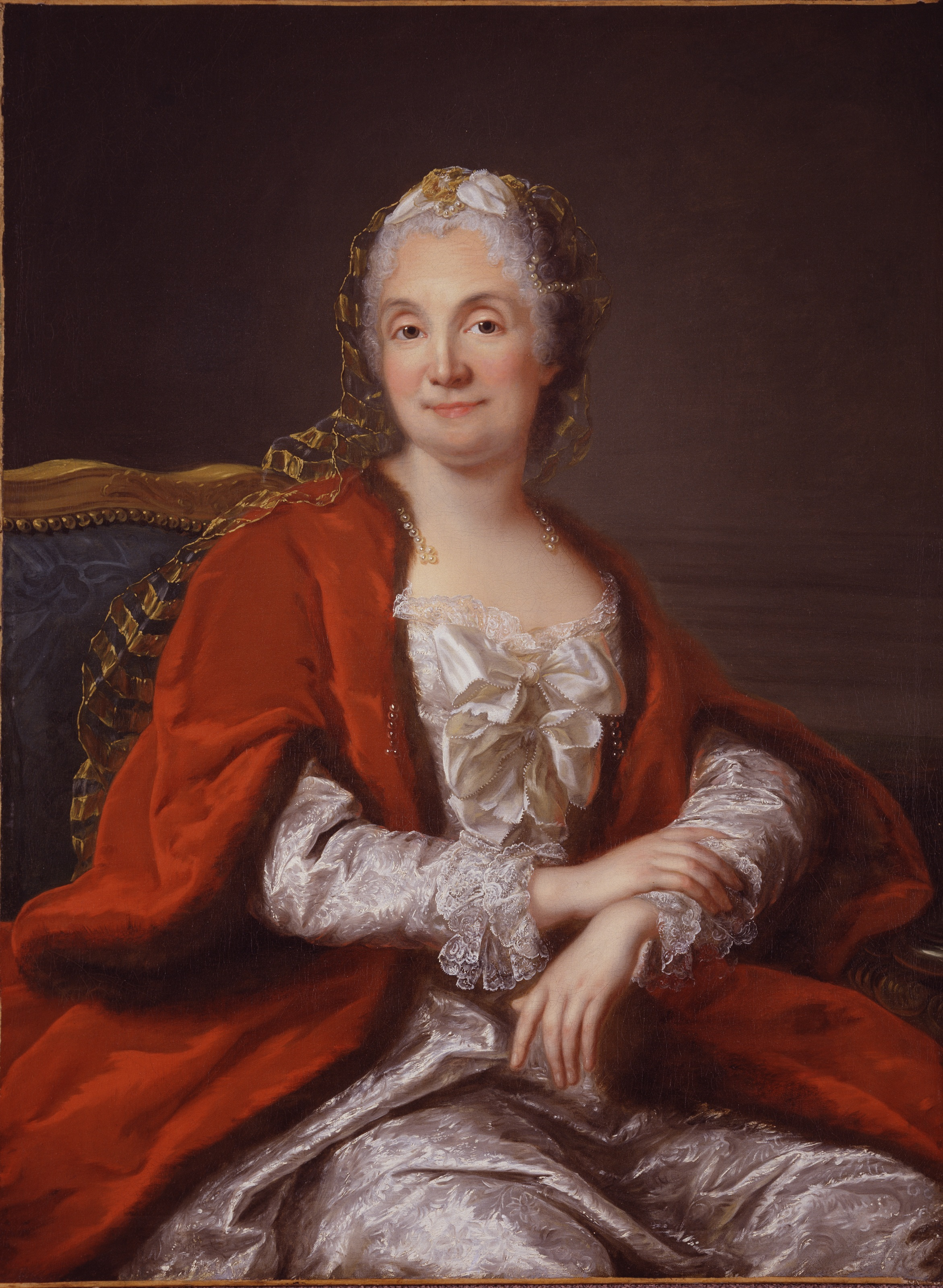
Portrait of Mme Geoffrin, salonnière, by Marianne Loir (National Museum of Women in the Arts, Washington, DC)

Historians have traditionally focused upon the role of women within salons. Works in the 19th and much of the 20th centuries often focused on the scandals and "petty intrigues" of the salons. Other works from this period focused on the more positive aspects of women in the salon. According to Jolanta T. Pekacz, the fact that women dominated the history of the salons meant that the study of salons was often left to amateurs, while men concentrated on "more important" (and masculine) areas of the Enlightenment.

Historians tended to focus on individual salonnières, creating almost a "great woman" version of history that ran parallel to the Whiggish, male-dominated history identified by Herbert Butterfield. Even in 1970, works were still being produced that concentrated only on individual stories without analysing the effects of the salonnières' unique position. The integral role that women played within salons as salonnières began to receive greater – and more serious – study in latter parts of the 20th century, with the emergence of a distinctly feminist historiography. The salons, according to Carolyn Lougee, were distinguished by "the very visible identification of women with salons" and the fact that they played a positive public role in French society. General texts on the Enlightenment, such as Daniel Roche's France in the Enlightenment, tend to agree that women were dominant within the salons, but that their influence did not extend far outside of such venues.

It was, however, Goodman's The Republic of Letters that ignited a real debate surrounding the role of women within the salons and the Enlightenment as a whole. According to Goodman: "The salonnières were not social climbers but intelligent, self-educated, and educating women who adopted and implemented the values of the Enlightenment Republic of Letters and used them to reshape the salon to their own social intellectual, and educational needs".

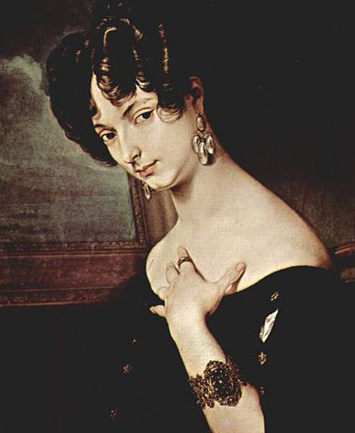
Italian in exile, Princess Belgiojoso 1832, salonnière in Paris where political and other émigré Italians, including composer Vincenzo Bellini, gathered in the 1830s. Portrait by Francesco Hayez

Wealthy members of the aristocracy have always drawn to their court poets, writers and artists, usually with the lure of patronage, an aspect that sets the court apart from the salon. Another feature that distinguished the salon from the court was its absence of social hierarchy and its mixing of different social ranks and orders. In the 17th and 18th centuries, "salon[s] encouraged socializing between the sexes [and] brought nobles and bourgeois together". Salons helped facilitate the breaking down of social barriers which made the development of the enlightenment salon possible. In the 18th century, under the guidance of Madame Geoffrin, Mlle de Lespinasse, and Madame Necker, the salon was transformed into an institution of Enlightenment. The enlightenment salon brought together Parisian society, the progressive philosophes who were producing the Encyclopédie, the Bluestockings and other intellectuals to discuss a variety of topics.

At that time, women had powerful influence over salons, where they carried very important roles as regulators who could select their guests and decide the subjects of their meetings, which could be social, literary, or political topics of the time. They also served as mediators by directing discussions. Salons were an informal form of education where women were able to exchange ideas, receive and give criticism, read their own works, and hear about the works and ideas of other intellectuals. Many ambitious women used salons to pursue a form of higher education.

Two of the most famous 17th-century literary salons in Paris were the Hôtel de Rambouillet, established in 1607 near the Palais du Louvre by the marquise de Rambouillet, where gathered the original précieuses, and, in 1652 in Le Marais, the rival salon of Madeleine de Scudéry, a long time habituée of the Hôtel de Rambouillet. Les bas-bleus, borrowed from England's "blue-stockings", soon found itself in use upon the attending ladies, a nickname continuing to mean "intellectual woman" for the next three hundred years.

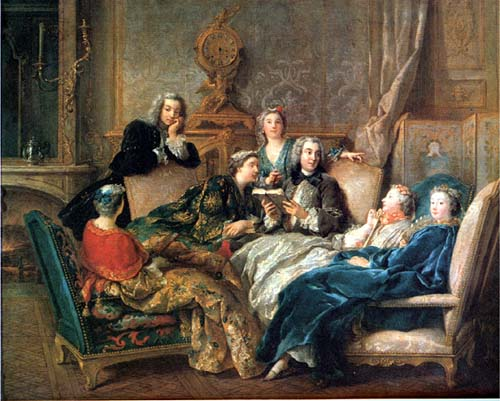
A reading of Molière, Jean François de Troy, c. 1728

Paris salons of the 18th century hosted by women include the following:

- Adèle and Aurore de Bellegarde
- Madame Geoffrin
- Madame de Tencin
- Jeanne Quinault, hostess of the Bout-du-Banc
- Madame Dupin
- Constance Pipelet, later Constance de Salm following her divorce
- Françoise de Graffigny, author of Lettres d'une Péruvienne
- Julie de Lespinasse: her chief draw was d'Alembert, but "though the name of M. d'Alembert may have drawn them thither, it was she alone who kept them there."
- the marquise du Deffand, the friend of Horace Walpole
- the marquise de Lambert
- the duchesse du Maine
- Madame d'Épinay
- Madame Necker, the wife of the financier Jacques Necker
- Madame de Staël, daughter of the Neckers, took over from her mother and in exile hosted the international Coppet group
- Madame Helvétius, the wife of Helvétius
- Sophie de Condorcet, wife of the mathematician and philosopher Condorcet, visited by foreign notables and French thinkers alike
- Juliette Récamier, socialite and friend of Germaine de Staël
- Madame Roland, the political salon that was the resort of the Girondists at the first stages of the Revolution
- Madame Swetchine, wife of General Swetchine
- Julie Talma, a friend of Benjamin Constant

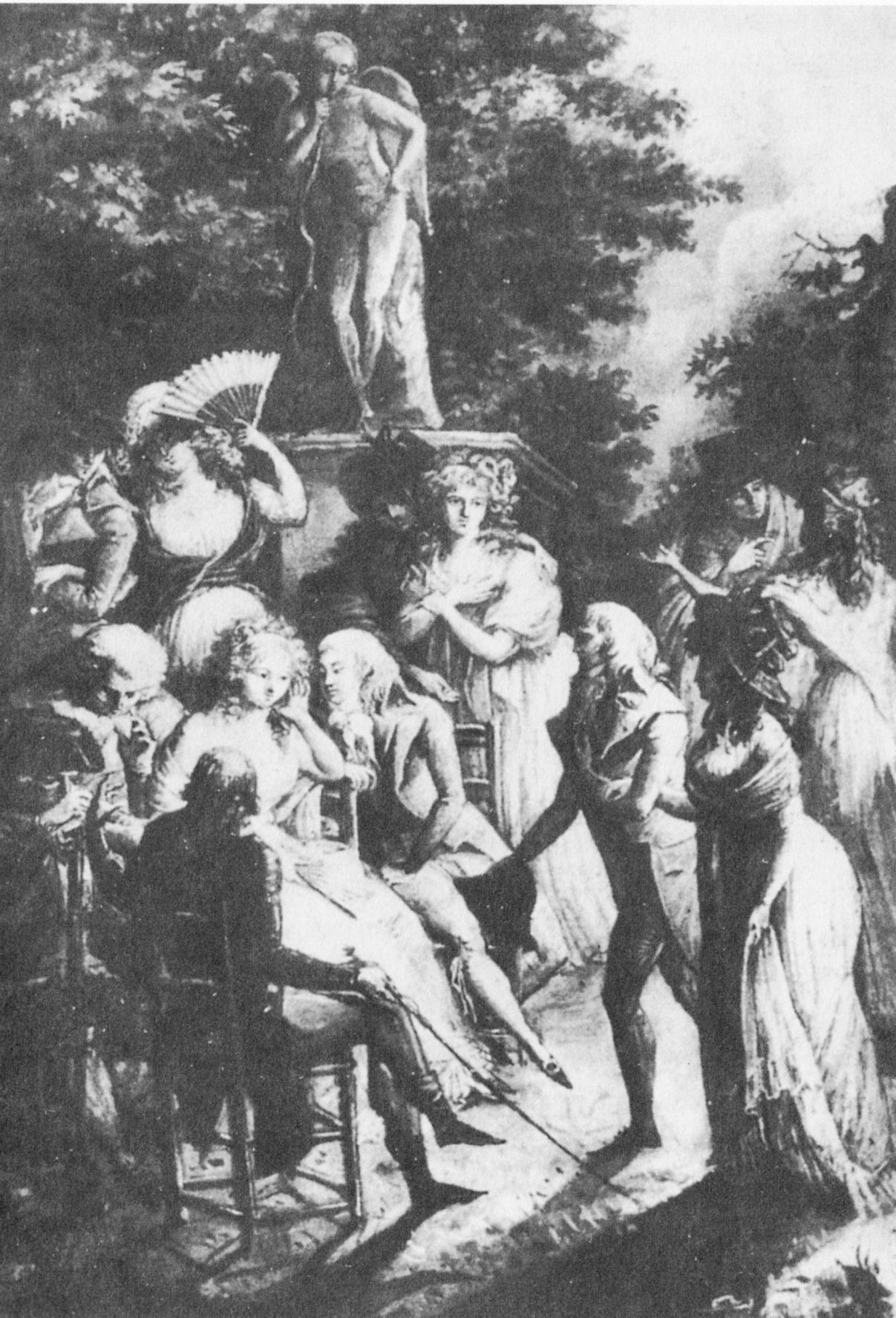
Madame de Staël at Coppet (Debucourt 1800)

Some 19th-century salons were more inclusive, verging on the raffish, and centered around painters and "literary lions" such as Madame Récamier. After the shock of the 1870 Franco-Prussian War, French aristocrats withdrew from the public eye. However, Princess Mathilde still held a salon in her mansion, rue de Courcelles, later rue de Berri. From the middle of the 19th century until the 1930s, a lady of society had to hold her "day", which meant that her salon was opened for visitors in the afternoon once a week, or twice a month. Days were announced in Le Bottin Mondain. The visitor gave his visit cards to the lackey or the maître d'hôtel, and he was accepted or not. Only people who had been introduced previously could enter the salon.

Marcel Proust called up his own turn-of-the-century experience to recreate the rival salons of the fictional duchesse de Guermantes and Madame Verdurin. He experienced himself his first social life in salons such as Mme Arman de Caillavet's one, which mixed artists and political men around Anatole France or Paul Bourget; Mme Straus' one, where the cream of the aristocracy mingled with artists and writers; or more aristocratic salons like Comtesse de Chevigné's, Comtesse Greffulhe's, Comtesse Jean de Castellane's, Comtesse Aimery de La Rochefoucauld's, etc. Some late 19th- and early 20th-century Paris salons were major centres for contemporary music, including those of Winnaretta Singer (the princesse de Polignac), and Élisabeth, comtesse Greffulhe. They were responsible for commissioning some of the greatest songs and chamber music works of Fauré, Debussy, Ravel and Poulenc.

Until the 1950s, some salons were held by ladies mixing political men and intellectuals during the IVth Republic, like Mme Abrami, or Mme Dujarric de La Rivière. The last salons in Paris were those of Marie-Laure de Noailles, with Jean Cocteau, Igor Markevitch, Salvador Dalí, etc., Marie-Blanche de Polignac (Jeanne Lanvin's daughter) and Madeleine and Robert Perrier, with Josephine Baker, Le Corbusier, Django Reinhardt, etc.

== Salons outside France ==
Salon sociability quickly spread through Europe. In the 18th and 19th centuries, many large cities in Europe held salons along the lines of the Parisian models.

=== Belgium ===
Prior to the formation of Belgium, Béatrix de Cusance hosted a salon in Brussels in what was then the Spanish Netherlands in the mid-17th century. In the late 18th century, the political salon of Anne d'Yves played a role in the Brabant Revolution of 1789.

In Belgium, the 19th-century salon hosted by Constance Trotti attracted cultural figures, the Belgian aristocracy and members of the French exiled colony.

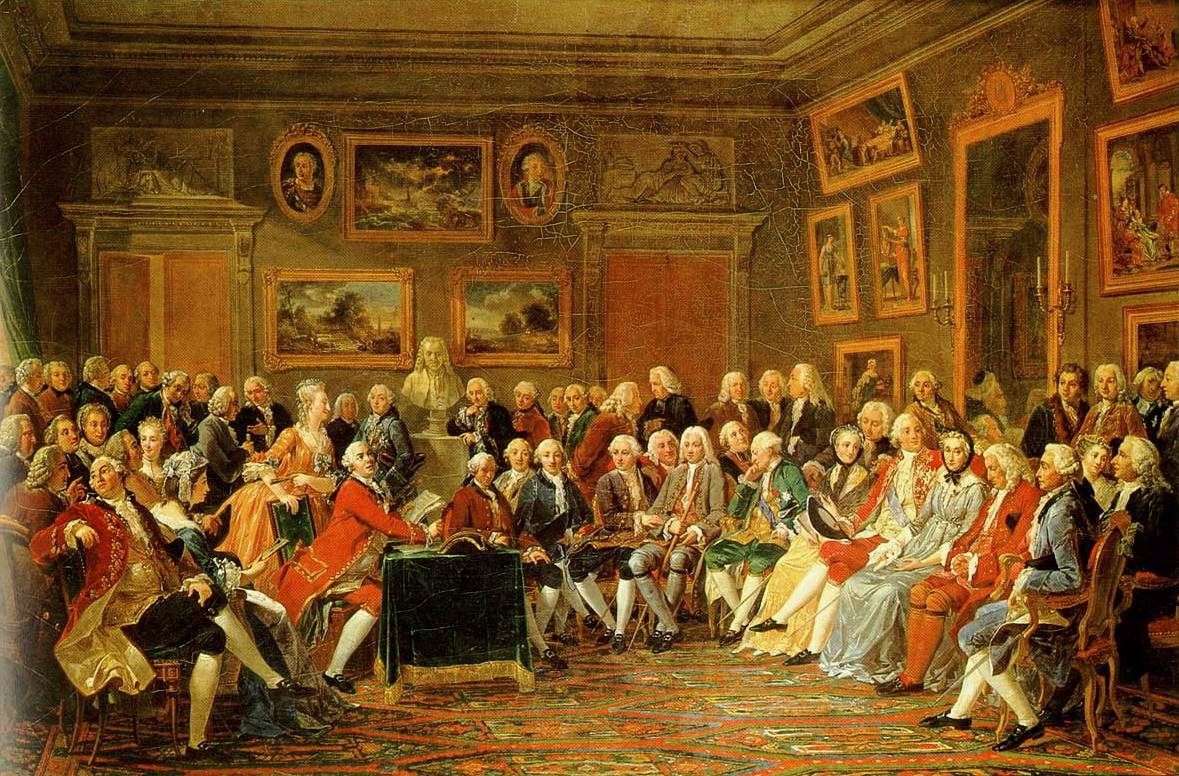
In the Salon of Madame Geoffrin in 1755 by Anicet Charles Gabriel Lemonnier

=== Denmark ===
In Denmark, the salon culture was adopted during the 18th century. Christine Sophie Holstein and Charlotte Schimmelman were the most notable hostesses, in the beginning and in the end of the 18th century respectively, both of whom were credited with political influence. During the Danish Golden Age in the late 18th century and early 19th century, the literary salon played a significant part in Danish culture life, notably the literary salons arranged by Friederike Brun at Sophienholm and that of Kamma Rahbek at Bakkehuset.

=== Jewish culture in Central Europe ===
In the German-speaking palatinates and kingdoms, the most famous were held by Jewish ladies, such as Henriette Herz, Sara Grotthuis, and Rahel Varnhagen, and in Austria in the late 18th and early 19th centuries by two prominent Jewish Patrons of the Arts: Adele Bloch-Bauer and Berta Zuckerkandl. Increasingly emancipated German-speaking Jews wanted to immerse themselves in the rich cultural life. However, individual Jews were faced with a dilemma: they faced new opportunities, but without the comfort of a secure community. For Jewish women, there was an additional issue. German society imposed the usual gender role restrictions and antisemitism, so cultivated Jewish women tapped into the cultural salon. But from 1800 on, salons performed a political and social miracle. The salon allowed Jewish women to establish a venue in their homes in which Jews and non-Jews could meet in relative equality. Like-minded people could study art, literature, philosophy or music together. This handful of educated, acculturated Jewish women could escape the restrictions of their social ghetto. Naturally the women had to be in well-connected families, either to money or to culture. In these mixed gatherings of nobles, high civil servants, writers, philosophers and artists, Jewish salonnières created a vehicle for Jewish integration, providing a context in which patrons and artists freely exchanged ideas. Henriette Lemos Herz, Fanny Mendelssohn Hensel, Dorothea Mendelssohn Schlegel, Amalie Wolf Beer and at least twelve other salonnières achieved fame and admiration.

=== Italy ===
Italy had had an early tradition of the salon; Giovanna Dandolo became known as a patron and gatherer of artists as wife of Pasquale Malipiero, the doge in Venice in 1457–1462, and the courtesan Tullia d'Aragona held a salon already in the 16th century, and in the 17th century Rome, the abdicated Queen Christina of Sweden and the princess Colonna, Marie Mancini, rivaled as salon hostesses. In the 18th century, Aurora Sanseverino provided a forum for thinkers, poets, artists, and musicians in Naples, making her a central figure in baroque Italy.

The tradition of the literary salon continued to flourish in Italy throughout the 19th century. Naturally there were many salons with some of the most prominent being hosted by Clara Maffei in Milan, Emilia Peruzzi in Florence and Olimpia Savio in Turin. The salons attracted countless outstanding 19th-century figures including the romantic painter Francesco Hayez, composer Giuseppe Verdi and naturalist writers Giovanni Verga, Bruno Sperani and Matilde Serao. The salons served a very important function in 19th-century Italy, as they allowed young attendees to come into contact with more established figures. They also served as a method of avoiding government censorship, as a public discussion could be held in private. The golden age of the salon in Italy could be said to coincide with the pre-unification period, after which the rise of the newspaper replaced the salon as the main place for the Italian public to engage in intellectual discourse.

=== Latin America ===
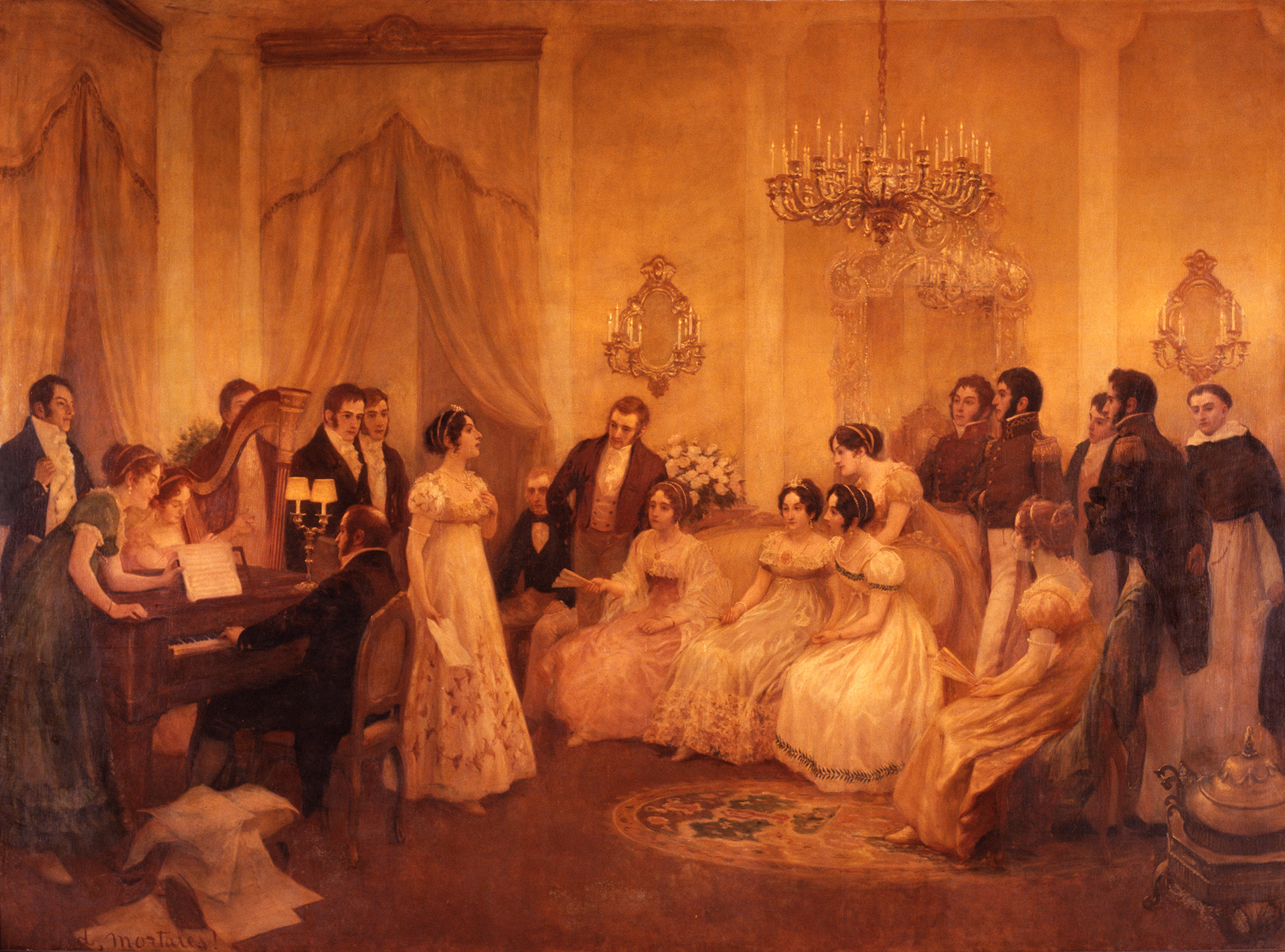
Mariquita Sánchez's salon in Buenos Aires, 1813

Argentina's most active female figure in the revolutionary process, Mariquita Sánchez, was Buenos Aires' leading salonnière. She fervently embraced the cause of revolution, and her tertulia gathered all the leading personalities of her time. The most sensitive issues were discussed there, as well as literary topics. Mariquita Sánchez is widely remembered in the Argentine historical tradition because the Argentine National Anthem was sung for the first time in her house, on 14 May 1813. Other notable salonnières in colonial Buenos Aires were Mercedes de Lasalde Riglos and Flora Azcuénaga. Along with Mariquita Sánchez, the discussions at her houses led up to the May Revolution, the first stage in the struggle for Argentine independence from Spain.

=== Poland-Lithuania ===
In the vast Commonwealth of Poland-Lithuania, Duchess Elżbieta Sieniawska held a salon at the end of the 17th century. They became very popular there throughout the 18th century. Most renowned were the Thursday Lunches of King Stanisław II Augustus at the end of the 18th century, and among the most notable salonnières were Barbara Sanguszko, Zofia Lubomirska, Anna Jabłonowska, a noted early scientist and collector of scientific objects and books, Izabela Czartoryska, and her later namesake, Princess Izabela Czartoryska founder of Poland's first museum and a patron of the Polish composer Frederic Chopin.

=== Russia ===
The salon culture was introduced to Imperial Russia during the Westernization Francophile culture of the Russian aristocracy in the 18th century. During the 19th century, several famous salon functioned hosted by the nobility in Saint Petersburg and Moscow, among the most famed being the literary salon of Zinaida Volkonskaya in 1820s Moscow.

=== Spain ===
In Spain, salons were popular during the French influenced Spanish enlightenment. One of the most known salons were held by María del Pilar Teresa Cayetana de Silva y Álvarez de Toledo, 13th Duchess of Alba at the end of the 18th century.

In Iberia or Latin America, a tertulia is a social gathering with literary or artistic overtones. The word is originally Spanish and has only moderate currency in English, in describing Latin cultural contexts. Since the 20th century, a typical tertulia has moved out from the private drawing-room to become a regularly scheduled event in a public place such as a bar, although some tertulias are still held in more private spaces. Participants may share their recent creations (poetry, short stories, other writings, even artwork or songs).

=== Sweden ===
In Sweden, the salon developed during the late 17th century and flourished until the late 19th century. During the 1680s and 1690s, the salon of countess Magdalena Stenbock became a meeting where foreign ambassadors in Stockholm came to make contacts, and her gambling table was described as a center of Swedish foreign policy.

During the Swedish Age of Liberty (1718–1772), women participated in political debate and promoted their favorites in the struggle between the Caps (party) and the Hats (party) through political salons. These forums were regarded influential enough for foreign powers to engage some of these women as agents to benefit their interests in Swedish politics. The arguably most noted political salonnière of the Swedish age of liberty was countess Hedvig Catharina De la Gardie (1695–1745), whose salon has some time been referred to as the first in Sweden, and whose influence on state affairs exposed her to libelous pamphlets and made her a target of Olof von Dahlin's libelous caricature of the political salon hostess in 1733. Magdalena Elisabeth Rahm was attributed to have contributed to the realization of the Russo-Swedish War (1741–1743) through the campaign for the war she launched in her salon. Outside of politics, Hedvig Charlotta Nordenflycht acted as the hostess of the literary academy Tankebyggarorden and Anna Maria Lenngren did the same for the Royal Swedish Academy.

During the reign of Gustavian age, the home of Anna Charlotta Schröderheim came to be known as a center of opposition. Salon hostesses were still attributed influence in politic affairs in the first half of the 19th century, which was said of both Aurora Wilhelmina Koskull in the 1820s as well as Ulla De Geer in the 1840s.

In the 19th century, however, the leading salon hostesses in Sweden became more noted as the benefactors of the arts and charity than with politics. From 1820 and two decades onward, Malla Silfverstolpe became famous for her Friday nights salon in Uppsala, which became a center of the Romantic era in Sweden and, arguably the most famed literary salon in Sweden. During the 1860s and 1870s, the Limnell Salon of the rich benefactor Fredrika Limnell in Stockholm came to be a famous center of the Swedish cultural elite, were especially writers gathered to make contact with wealthy benefactors, a role which was eventually taken over by the Curman Receptions of Calla Curman in the 1880s and 1890s.

=== Switzerland ===
In Switzerland, the salon culture was extant in the mid-18th century, represented by Julie Bondeli in Bern and Barbara Schulthess in Zürich, and the salon of Anna Maria Rüttimann-Meyer von Schauensee reached in influential role in the early 19th century.

In Coppet Castle close to Lake Geneva, the exiled Parisian salonnière and author, Madame de Staël, hosted a salon which played a key role in the aftermath of the French Revolution and especially under Napoleon Bonaparte's Regime. It has become known as the Coppet group. De Staël is author of around thirty publications, from which On Germany (1813) was the most well known in its time. She has been painted by such famous painters as François Gérard and Elisabeth Vigée-Lebrun.

=== United Kingdom ===
In 18th-century England, salons were held by Elizabeth Montagu, in whose salon the expression bluestocking originated, and who created the Blue Stockings Society, and by Hester Thrale. In the 19th century, the Russian Baroness Méry von Bruiningk hosted a salon in St. John's Wood, London, for refugees (mostly German) of the revolutions of 1848 (the Forty-Eighters). Clementia Taylor, an early feminist and radical held a salon at Aubrey House in Campden Hill in the 1860s. Her salon was attended by Moncure D. Conway, Louisa May Alcott, Arthur Munby, feminists Barbara Bodichon, Lydia Becker, Elizabeth Blackwell, and Elizabeth Malleson. Holland House in Kensington under the Fox family in the late 18th and early 19th centuries was akin to a French salon, largely for adherents to the Whig Party. Charles Babbage's Saturday night soirées from 1828 and into the 1840s were a related phenomenon attracting men and women, scientists and writers.

=== United States ===
Martha Washington, the first American First Lady, performed a function similar to the host or hostess of the European salon. She held weekly public receptions throughout her husband's eight-year presidency (1789–1797). At these gatherings, members of Congress, visiting foreign dignitaries, and ordinary citizens alike were received at the executive mansion. More recently, "society hostesses" such as Perle Mesta have done so as well. The Stettheimer sisters, including the artist Florine Stettheimer, hosted gatherings at their New York City home in the 1920s and '30s. During the Harlem Renaissance, Ruth Logan Roberts, Georgia Douglas Johnson and Zora Neale Hurston hosted salons that brought together leading figures in African-American literature, and in the culture and politics of Harlem at the time.

== Modern-day salons ==
Modern-day versions of the traditional salon (some with a literary focus, and others exploring other disciplines in the arts and sciences) are held throughout the world, in private homes and public venues.

Sally Quinn and her husband Ben Bradlee hosted influential salons in Washington DC from the 1970s until the 2000s. "An invitation to the couple's historic Georgetown home was one of the most coveted status symbols in the nation's capital, an entry to an elite salon of the powerful, talented and witty." In the 1980s, former nun and musician Theodora di Marco and her sister Norma hosted musical and debating soirées in their home in Notting Hill, London. Daniel Dennett ran a salon for many years through the 1990s and 2000s on Intelligence. Regular attendees included Marcel Kinsbourne, Ray Jackendoff, and Marc Hauser, according to Rodney Brooks.

In 2014, in response to the isolation of the digital life, in-person events and salons grew in popularity. In 2021 response to the isolation of the pandemic, Susan MacTavish Best, who was part of the movement, launched an educational resource for those who wish to host salons in their community called The Salon Host. In late 2024 Peyton Kullander/Ophelie started a movement to bring salons back into the public consciousness, called The Temptations Artist Salon and Zine, aiming to encourage the discussion and banter of the past.

== Other uses of the word ==
The word salon also refers to art exhibitions. The Paris Salon was originally an officially sanctioned exhibit of recent works of painting and sculpture by members of the Académie royale de peinture et de sculpture, starting in 1673 and soon moving from the Salon Carré of the Palace of the Louvre.

The name salon remained, even when other quarters were found and the exhibits' irregular intervals became biennial. A jury system of selection was introduced in 1748, and the salon remained a major annual event even after the government withdrew official sponsorship in 1881.

The related terms salon-style exhibition or salon-style hang describe the practice of displaying large numbers of paintings, thus requiring placing them close together at multiple heights, often on a high wall.

== See also ==
- Coffeehouse
- English coffeehouses in the seventeenth and eighteenth centuries
- French art salons and academies
- Levee (ceremony)
- Paris Salon
- Salon.com
- Salon d'Automne
- Salon des Indépendants
- Salon des Refusés
- Social center
- Stammtisch
- Schubertiade
- Charles Babbage's Saturday night soirées

== Bibliography ==
- Craveri, Benedetta, The Age of Conversation (New York: New York Review Books, 2005)
- Dollinger, Petra, Salon, EGO - European History Online, Mainz: Institute of European History, 2019, retrieved: March 8, 2021 (pdf).
- Davetian, Benet, Civility: A Cultural History (University of Toronto Press, 2009)
- Elias, Norbert, (Trans. Edmund Jephcott), The Civilizing Process: The History of Manners, Vol. 1 (Oxford: Basil Blackwell, 1978)
- Goodman, Dena, The Republic of Letters: A Cultural History of the French Enlightenment (Ithaca: Cornell University Press, 1994)
- Goodman, Dena, "Enlightenment Salons: The Convergence of Female and Philosophic Ambitions", Eighteenth-Century Studies, Vol. 22, No. 3, Special Issue: The French Revolution in Culture (Spring, 1989), pp. 329–350
- Kale, Steven, French Salons: High Society and Political Sociability from the Old Regime to the Revolution of 1848 (Baltimore: Johns Hopkins University Press, 2006)
- Habermas, Jürgen, (trans. Thomas Burger), The Structural Transformation of the Public Sphere: An Inquiry into a Category of Bourgeois Society (Camb., Mass.: MIT Press, 1989)
- Harth, Erica, Cartesian Women: Versions and Subversions of Rational Discourse in the Old Regime (Ithaca: Cornell University Press, 1992).
- Huddleston, Sisley, Bohemian, Literary and Social Life in Paris: Salons, Cafes, Studios (London: George G. Harrap, 1928)
- Kavanagh, Julia, Women in France during the Enlightenment Century, 2 Vols (New York: G. P. Putnam's Sons, 1893)
- Landes, Joan B., Women and the Public Sphere in the Age of the French Revolution (Ithaca: Cornell University Press, 1988);
- Latour, Anny (Trans. A. A. Dent), Uncrowned Queens: Reines Sans Couronne (London: J. M. Dent, 1970)
- Lougee, Carolyn C., Le Paradis des Femmes: Women, Salons and Social Stratification in Seventeenth Century France (Princeton: Princeton University Press, 1976)
- Lilti, Antoine, "Sociabilité et mondanité: Les hommes de lettres dans les salons parisiens au XVIIIe siècle", French Historical Studies, Vol. 28, No. 3 (Summer 2005), p. 415-445
- Pekacz, Jolanta T., Conservative Tradition In Pre-Revolutionary France: Parisian Salon Women (New York: Peter Lang, 1999)
- Quennell, Peter ed., Genius in the Drawing-Room: The Literary Salon in the Nineteenth and Twentieth Centuries (London: Weidenfeld & Nicolson, 1980)
- Roche, Daniel, (Trans Arthur Goldhammr), France in the Enlightenment (Cambridge, Massachusetts: HUP, 1998)
- Tallentyre, S. G., Women of the Salons (New York: G. P. Putnam's Sons, 1926)
- Von der Heyden-Rynsch, Verena, Europaeische Salons. Hoehepunkte einer versunken weiblichen Kultur (Düsseldorf: Artemis & Winkler, 1997)
