= Jean Charles Léonard de Sismondi =

Swiss economist and historian (1773–1842)

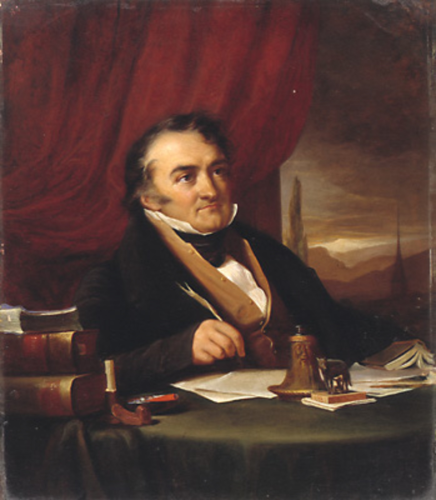
- Jean Charles de Sismondi
- Born: Jean Charles Léonard Simonde; 9 May 1773; Geneva, Republic of Geneva
- Died: 25 June 1842 (aged 69); Chêne-Bougeries, Canton of Geneva, Swiss Confederation

Academic background
- Influences: Smith; Ferguson; Machiavelli; Montesquieu; Lolme

Academic work
- Discipline: Political economy
- School or tradition: Classical economics
- Notable ideas: Theory of the business cycle

Jean Charles Léonard de Sismondi, also known as Jean Charles Leonard Simonde de Sismondi (French: [ʒɑ̃ ʃaʁl leɔnaʁ də sismɔ̃di]; 9 May 1773 – 25 June 1842), whose real surname was Simonde, was a Swiss historian and political economist, who is best known for his works on French and Italian history, and his economic ideas. His Nouveaux principes d'économie politique, ou de la richesse dans ses rapports avec la population (1819) represents the first liberal critique of laissez-faire economics. He was one of the pioneering advocates of unemployment insurance, sickness benefits, a progressive tax, regulation of working hours, and a pension scheme. He was also the first to coin the term proletariat to refer to the working class created under capitalism, and his discussion of mieux value anticipates the concept of surplus value. According to Gareth Stedman Jones, "much of what Sismondi wrote became part of the standard repertoire of socialist criticism of modern industry", earning him critical commentary in the Communist Manifesto.

== Biography ==
=== Early life and education ===
His paternal family seem to have borne the name Simonde, at least from the time when they migrated from Dauphiné to the Republic of Geneva at the revocation of the edict of Nantes. It was not till after Sismondi had become an author that, observing the identity of his family arms with those of the once flourishing Pisan house of the Sismondi and finding that some members of that house had migrated to France, he assumed the connection without further proof and called himself Sismondi.

The Simondes, however, were themselves citizens of Geneva of the upper class, and possessed both rank and property, though the father was also a village pastor. His uncle by marriage was the prominent pastor Jacob Vernes, a friend of Voltaire and Rousseau.

The future historian was well educated, but his family wished him to devote himself to commerce rather than literature, and he became a banker's clerk in Lyon. Then the Revolution broke out, and as it affected Geneva, the Simonde family took refuge in England where they stayed for eighteen months (1793–1794). Disliking—it is said—the climate, they returned to Geneva, but found the state of affairs still unfavourable; there is even a legend that the head of the family was reduced to selling milk himself in the town. The greater part of the family property was sold, and with the proceeds they emigrated to Italy, bought a small farm in Pescia near Lucca and Pistoia, and set to work to cultivate it themselves.

Sismondi worked hard there, with both his hands and mind, and his experiences gave him the material of his first book, Tableau de l'agriculture toscane, which, after returning to Geneva, he published there in 1801. At a young age, Sismondi had read The Wealth of Nations and became strongly attached to Smith's theories. He apparently published his first work on the subject of political economy, De la richesse commerciale ou principes de l'economie politique appliqué à la legislation du commerce (1803), to explain and popularize Smith's doctrine, but following this Sismondi spent a considerable amount of time dedicated to historical research. He again turned his attention to political economy around 1818 when he was commissioned to write an entry on "Political Economy" for the Edinburgh Encyclopædia. This was just following a serious economic downturn after the outbreak of the first major crisis in 1815.

=== Later life ===
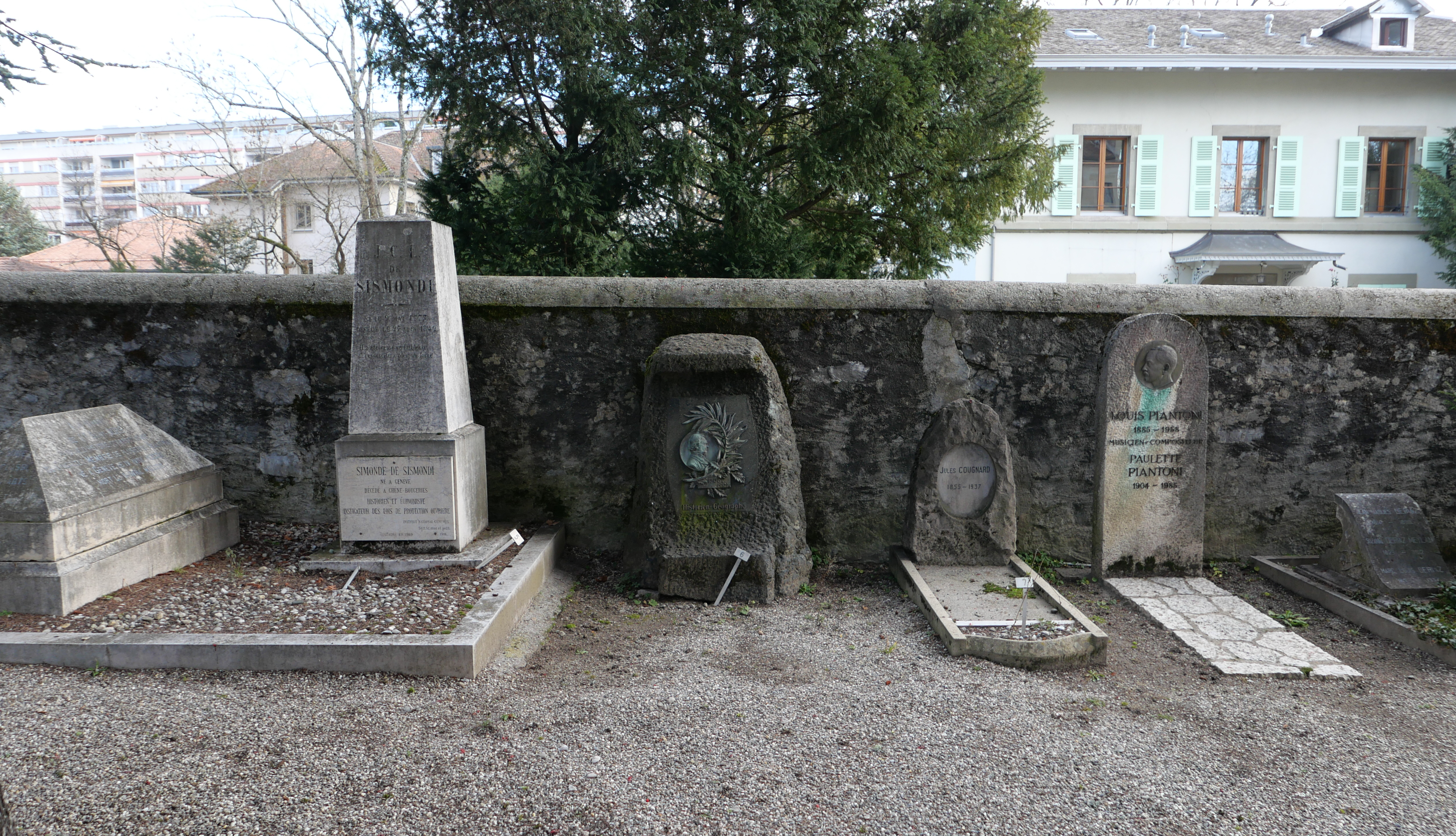
Sismondi's grave (2nd from left) at the cemetery of Chêne-Bougeries

In April 1819 Sismondi married a Welshwoman, Jessie Allen (1777–1853), whose sister, Catherine Allen, was the wife of Sir James Mackintosh and whose other sister, Elizabeth Allen, was the wife of Josiah Wedgwood II and mother of Emma Wedgwood, who was married to Charles Darwin. This marriage appears to have been a very happy one. Sismondi joined his wife on several visits to London, where they attended Charles Babbage's Saturday night soirées with the Darwins on several occasions.

In 1826 he was elected a foreign member of the Royal Swedish Academy of Sciences.

After spending the last years of his life in Geneva preparing new editions of his writings, finishing his study of the French, and serving as a member of the Geneva Assembly, speaking for freedom with order, he died in 1842 of stomach cancer.

== Economy ==
=== Criticism of economic orthodoxy ===
Title page of Nouveaux principes d'économie politique

As an economist, Sismondi represented a humanitarian protest against the dominant orthodoxy of his time. In his 1803 book, he followed Adam Smith; but in his principal subsequent economic work, Nouveaux principes d'économie politique (1819), he insisted on the fact that economic science studied the means of increasing wealth too much, and the use of wealth for producing happiness, too little. For the science of economics, his most important contribution was probably his discovery of economic cycles. In contrast to other thinkers at the time (notably J. B. Say and David Ricardo), Sismondi challenged the idea that economic equilibrium leading to full employment would be spontaneously achieved. He wrote, "Let us beware of this dangerous theory of equilibrium which is supposed to be automatically established. A certain kind of equilibrium, it is true, is reestablished in the long run, but it is after a frightful amount of suffering." Sismondi also argued that classical economics failed to consider the negative social and environmental impacts of economic growth, and that it failed to address issues of income inequality and social justice. Although his thinking is characterized as "petty-bourgeois Socialism" in the Communist Manifesto, Sismondi was not a socialist. Nonetheless, in protesting against laissez faire and invoking the state "to regulate the progress of wealth", he was an interesting precursor of the German historical school of economics.

Focuses of his work are central to the idea of taking particular economic situations and analyzing them in the situational setting of history from which one is drawing data or insight.

Sismondi is known for the study of economic crises rooting from "the social ramifications of the economic system rather than on its structure". His interpretations put him before Marx, in semi-defining the bourgeoisie and proletariat division in society. Key to his philosophy, Sismondi saw these class divisions to coincide with crises in the economy and didn't see extreme social reform as the answer, but rather moderate versions that allowed for technological advances to be slowed for the economy to catch up, via limiting production and the limitation of what he referred to as “the prevailing glorification of free competition”, all while, most importantly, allowing individuals to retain private property and any revenues generated from it.

His theory may more precisely be classed as one of periodic crises, rather than cycles per se. and as such is the earliest theorist of systemic crisis theory. His theory was adapted by Charles Dunoyer, who introduces the notion of cycling between two phases, thus giving a modern form of economic cycle.

As important was his role as an economist; Sismondi was renowned as a historian. He commonly applied economic thought and historical settings to explain the irrationality of past economic events.

Sismondi also contributed a great deal to economics with his thoughts on aggregate demand. Observing the capitalist industrial system in England, Sismondi saw that unchecked competition both resulted in producers all increasing individual production (because of lack of knowledge of other producers' production) this was then seen as forcing employers to cut prices, which they did by sacrificing workers' wages. This yielded overproduction and underconsumption; with most of England's workforce suffering from depressed wages, workers were then unable to afford the goods they had produced, and underconsumption of goods then followed. Sismondi believed that by increasing the wages of laborers they would have more buying power, be able to buy the national output and thus increase demand.

In his book On Classical Economics, Thomas Sowell devotes a chapter to Sismondi, arguing that he was a neglected pioneer.

=== Other works ===
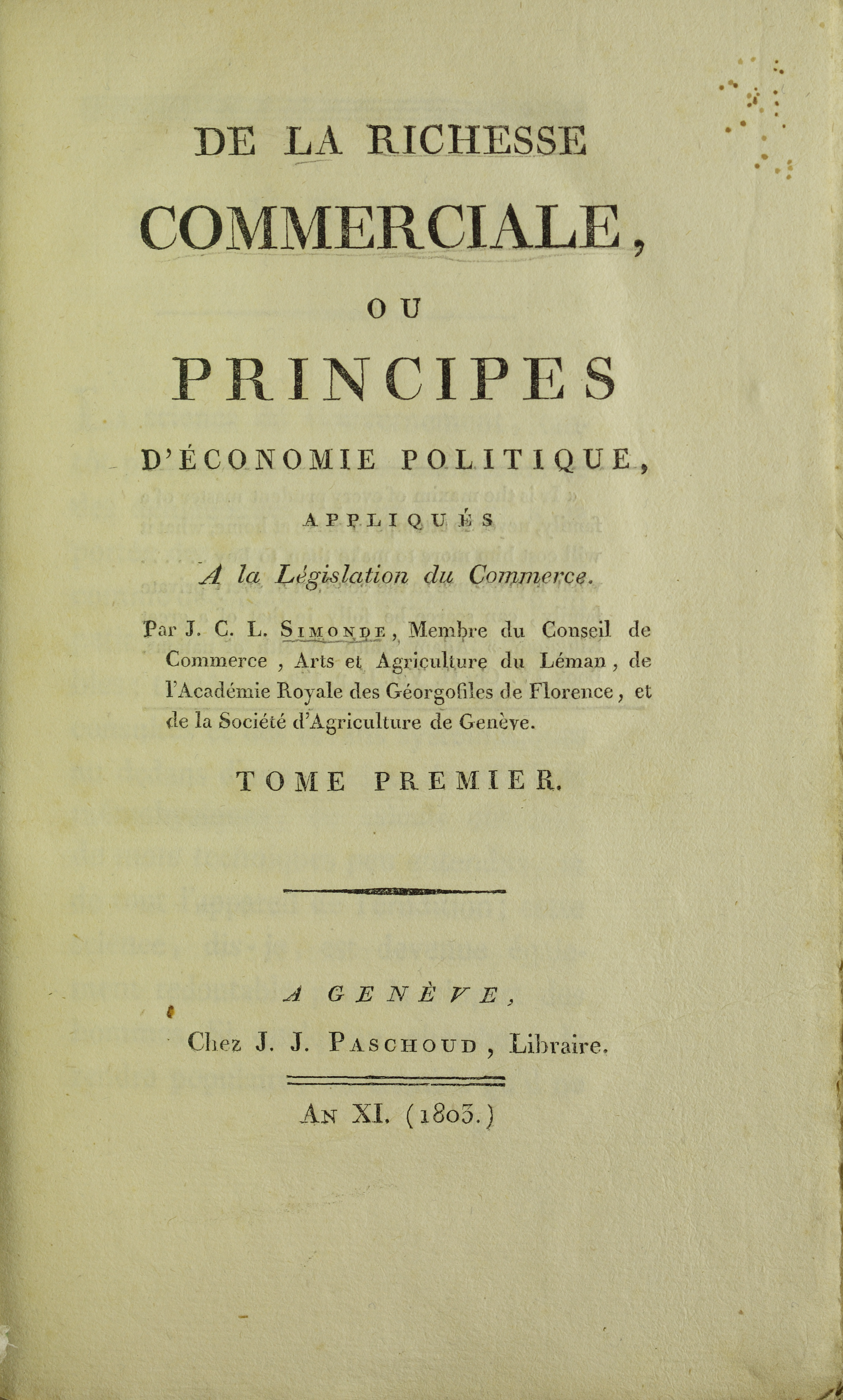
De la richesse commerciale, 1803

Besides the works mentioned above Sismondi produced many others, never working less than eight hours a day for many years. The most important ones are: Littérature du midi de l'Europe [Literature of Southern Europe] (1813), a historical novel entitled Julia Severa ou l'an 492 (1822), Histoire de la renaissance de la liberté en Italie (1832), Histoire de la chute de l'Empire romain (1835), Précis de l'histoire des Français, an abridgment of his own book (1839), and several others, mainly political pamphlets.

Sismondi's journals and his correspondence with Channing, with the countess of Albany and with others have been published mainly by M^{lle} Mongolfier (Paris, 1843) and M. de Saint-René Taillandier (Paris, 1863). The latter work serves as the main text of two admirable Lundis of Sainte-Beuve (September 1863), republished in the Nouveaux Lundis, vol. VI.

== History ==
=== Italian history ===
Meanwhile, he began to compile his great Histoire des républiques italiennes du Moyen Âge, and was introduced to Madame de Staël. He became part of her Coppet group; he was invited or commanded—for Madame de Staël was of chief political importance—to form one of the suite with which the future Corinne made the journey to Italy, which contributed to Corinne itself during the years 1804–1805. Sismondi was not altogether at ease here, and he particularly disliked Schlegel who was also a participant. But during this journey he met the Countess of Albany, widow of Charles Edward, who all her life was gifted with a singular ability to attract the affection of men of letters. Sismondi's platonic relationship with her was close and lasted long, and they produced much valuable and interesting correspondence.

In 1807 appeared the first volumes of the above-mentioned book about the Italian republics, which, though his essay in political economy had brought him some reputation and the offer of a Russian professorship, first made Sismondi a prominent man among European men of letters. The completion of this book, which extended to sixteen volumes, occupied him, though by no means entirely, for the next eleven years. He lived at first in Geneva where he delivered some interesting lectures about the literature of southern Europe, which were continued from time to time and finally published. He held an official position: secretary of the chamber of commerce for the then-department of Léman.

=== French history ===
Sismondi lived in Paris from 1813 until the Restoration, supporting Napoleon Bonaparte and meeting him once. Upon completing his book on Italian history, in 1818 he began his Histoire des Français, published in 29 volumes over 23 years. According to Encyclopædia Britannica, "His untiring industry enabled him to compile many other books, but it is on these two that his fame mainly rests. The former displays his qualities in the most favourable light, and has been least injuriously affected by subsequent writings and investigations. But the latter, as a careful and accurate sketch on a grand scale, has now been superseded. Sainte-Beuve has, with benevolent sarcasm, surnamed the author "the Rollin of French History", and the praise and the blame implied in the comparison are both perfectly well deserved".

== Legacy ==
=== Historiographical position and political stance ===
He was a historian whose economic ideas passed through different phases. The acceptance of free trade principles in De la richesse commerciale was abandoned in favour of a critical posture towards free trade and industrialisation. Nouveaux principes d'économie politique attacked wealth accumulation both as an end in itself, and for its detrimental effect on the poor. He indicated contradictions of capitalism. He criticized the harsh conditions endured by the workers from the standpoint of a liberal republican.Sismondi is also regarded as an important early critic of economic inequality and social instability created by unchecked markets. He argued that national wealth should be measured by improvements in human welfare rather than production alone, because rising output could still leave workers in poverty or insecurity. He warned that industrial competition could create unemployment, overproduction, and unequal distribution of income when economic activity was left without restraint. Later historians of economic thought have described these arguments as an early foundation for welfare economics and broader critiques of capitalism, especially because Sismondi emphasized that economies should serve people rather than treat labor only as a cost of production. He was also a passionate opponent of slavery. Adolphe Blanqui said of him: "No writer has shown a sympathy more notable and more touching for the working classes." Jean-Baptiste Say referred to Sismondi as "that enlightened author, ingenious, eloquent and selfless".

His critique was noticed by Malthus, David Ricardo and J. S. Mill, who called his writing "sprightly, and frequently eloquent". While a young man at Edinburgh, Thomas Carlyle translated Sismondi's article on "Political Economy" for David Brewster's Edinburgh Encyclopædia. Sismondi subsequently influenced Carlyle's conception of the Dismal Science. Sismondi's Italian histories were read and esteemed by Lord Byron, Percy Bysshe Shelley, and Stendhal.

Sismondi influenced many major socialist thinkers including Karl Marx, Rosa Luxemburg, and Robert Owen. Marx thought Sismondi embodied the critique of the "bourgeois science of economics". In his notes, Marx excerpted various aspects of his analysis. Marx was particularly fond of Sismondi's statement that "The Roman proletariat lived almost exclusively at the expense of society. One could almost say that modern society lives at the expense of the proletariat, from the share which it deducts from the reward of his labor." Henryk Grossman argued that Sismondi was a significant methodological and theoretical predecessor of Marx, particularly by identifying the contradiction between use-value and exchange-value as fundamental to capitalism. In 1897, Vladimir Lenin wrote an article refuting Sismondi's work. Lenin said,

The contributor to Russkoye Bogatstvo states at the very outset that no writer has been "so wrongly appraised" as Sismondi, who, he alleges, has been "unjustly" represented, now as a reactionary, then as a utopian. The very opposite is true. Precisely this appraisal of Sismondi is quite correct.

In 1913, Rosa Luxemburg wrote a critique of Sismondi in The Accumulation of Capital.

The historian Jerzy Jedlicki writes:

All sorts of labels were pinned on this humanist from Geneva who lived in the period of the beginnings of industrial capitalism: he was regarded as a reactionary and a radical, a petty-bourgeois socialist and a romanticist. But when we read his work a hundred and fifty years later, we discover in him a precursor of the democratized, corrective liberalism of the twentieth century and also, in spite of all the defects of his economic theory, a precursor of concepts for the development of overpopulated countries with a low national income. Sismondi’s thought, unfettered by doctrine, has stood the test of time, something which cannot be said of many of his contemporaries.

== Works ==
- Tableau de l'agriculture toscane (1801)
- De la richesse commerciale (1803)
- The History of the Italian Republics in the Middle Ages (Histoire des républiques italiennes du Moyen Âge) (16 vols.) (1807–18). His most important historical work, on Italy's republican past, which became an inspiration to 19th-century Italian nationalists.
- De l'intérêt de la France à l'égard de la traite des nègres (1814)
- Nouvelles réflexions sur la traite des nègres (1814)
- Examen de la Constitution française (1815)
- Political Economy (1815)
- Nouveaux principes d'économie politique, ou de la richesse dans ses rapports avec la population (1819)
- Histoire des Français (1821–1844)
- Les colonies des anciens comparées à celles des modernes (1837)
- Études de sciences sociales (1837)
- Études sur l'économie politique (1837)
- Précis de l'histoire des Français (1839)
- Fragments de son journal et correspondance (1857)
