= Coppet =

- Municipality
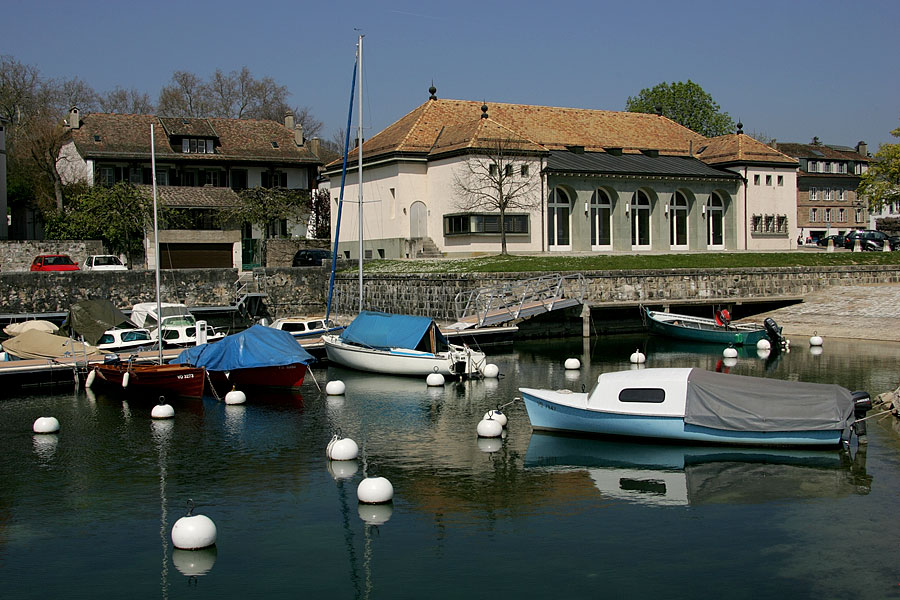
- Coppet port

- Flag Coat of arms
- Location of Coppet
- Location within Switzerland Location within Canton of Vaud
- Coordinates: 46°19′N 6°11.5′E
- Country: Switzerland
- Canton: Vaud
- District: Nyon

Government
  - Mayor: Syndic; Gérard Produit

Area
  - Total: 1.93 km^{2} (0.75 sq mi)
- Elevation: 373 m (1,224 ft)

Population (2004)
  - Total: 2,333
  - Density: 1,210/km^{2} (3,130/sq mi)
- Time zone: UTC+01:00 (CET)
  - Summer (DST): UTC+02:00 (CEST)
- Postal code: 1296
- SFOS number: 5712
- ISO 3166 code: CH-VD
- Surrounded by: Chens-sur-Léman (FR-74), Commugny, Founex, Hermance (GE), Tannay
- Website: www.coppet.ch

Coppet is a municipality in the district of Nyon in the canton of Vaud in Switzerland.

== History ==
Coppet is first mentioned in 1294 as Copetum. In 1347 it was mentioned as Copet.

== Geography ==
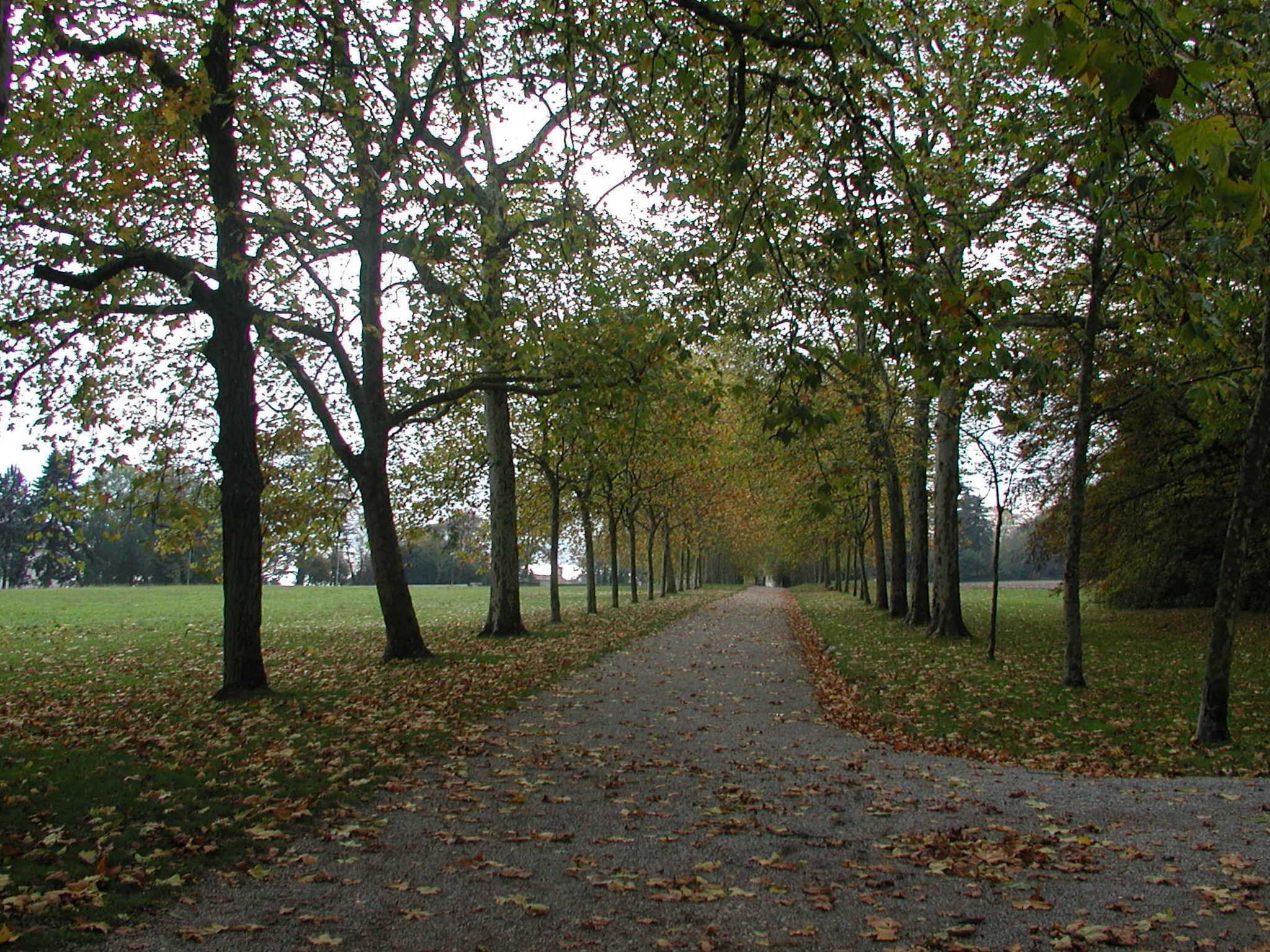
Grounds of Coppet Castle

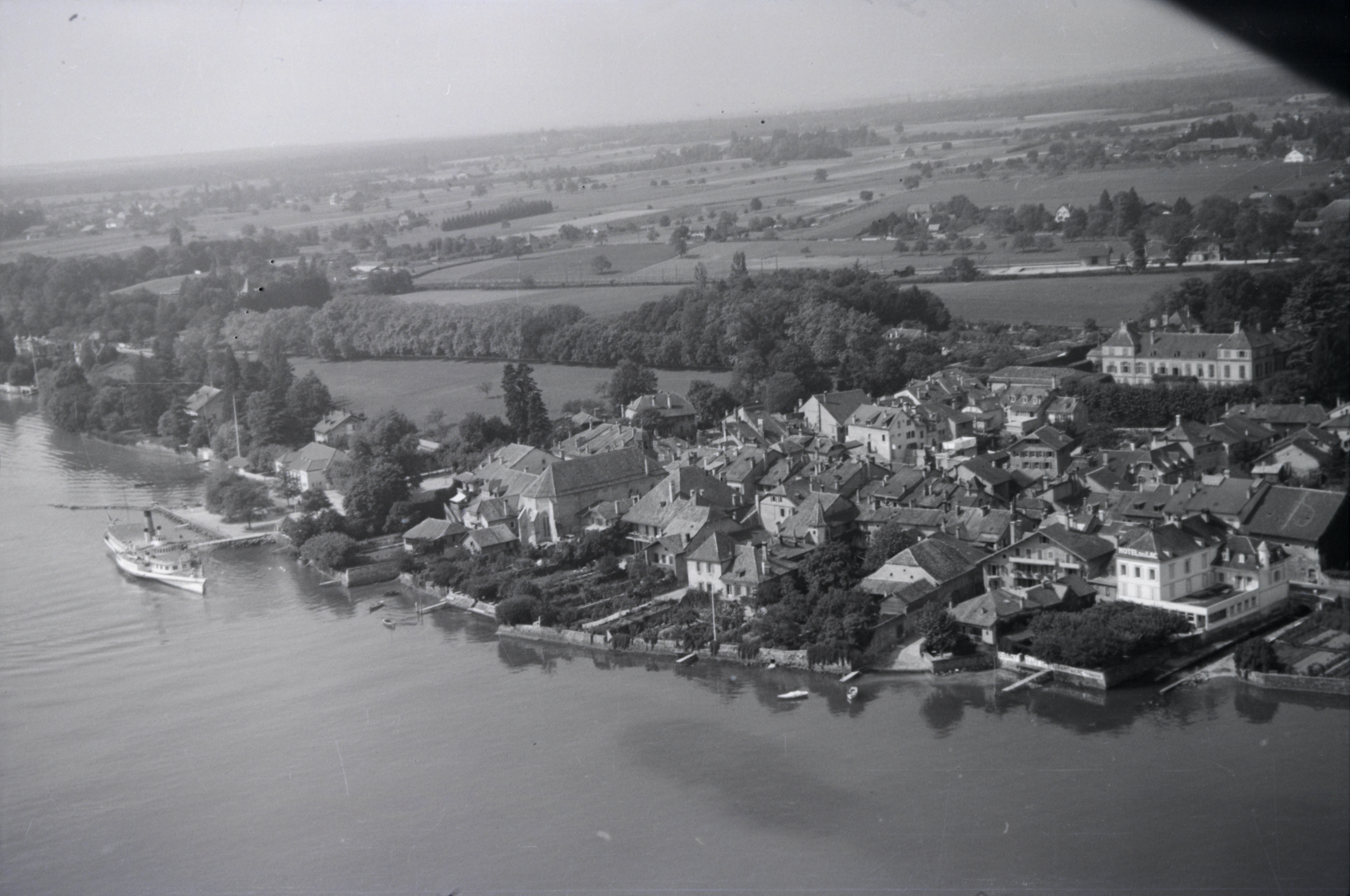
Aerial view by Walter Mittelholzer (1935)

Coppet has an area (as of 2009), of 1.9 square kilometers (0.73 mi^{2}). Of this area, 0.63 km^{2} (0.24 mi^{2}) or 33.7% is used for agricultural purposes, while 0.06 km^{2} (0.023 mi^{2}) or 3.2% is forested. Of the rest of the land, 1.17 km^{2} (0.45 mi^{2}) or 62.6% is settled (buildings or roads), 0.01 km^{2} (2.5 acres) or 0.5% is either rivers or lakes.

Of the built up area, housing and buildings made up 45.5% and transportation infrastructure made up 9.1%. Power and water infrastructure as well as other special developed areas made up 3.7% of the area while parks, green belts and sports fields made up 4.3%. Out of the forested land, all of the forested land area is covered with heavy forests. Of the agricultural land, 22.5% is used for growing crops and 5.9% is pastures, while 5.3% is used for orchards or vine crops. All the water in the municipality is in lakes.

The municipality was part of the old Nyon District until it was dissolved on 31 August 2006, and Coppet became part of the new district of Nyon.

The municipality is located along the banks of Lake Geneva on the Lausanne-Geneva road, the Route Suisse.

== Coat of arms ==
The blazon of the municipal coat of arms is Azure, a Chalice Argent.

== Demographics ==
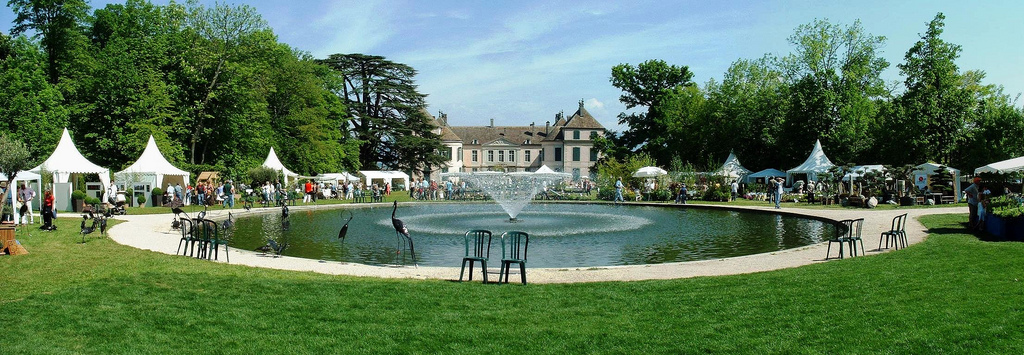
Château de Coppet

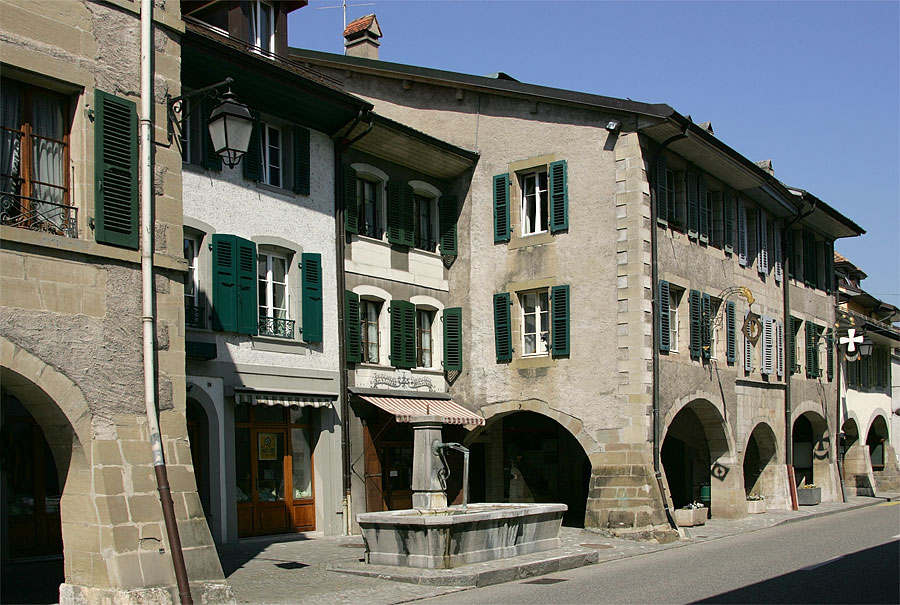
Fountain and arcades in Coppet

Coppet has a population (as of December 2020) of 3,280. As of 2008, 41.1% of the population are resident foreign nationals. Over the last 10 years (1999–2009) the population has changed at a rate of 29.9%. It has changed at a rate of 24% due to migration and at a rate of 7.1% due to births and deaths.

Most of the population (as of 2000) speaks French (1,678 or 71.1%), with English being second most common (247 or 10.5%) and German being third (173 or 7.3%). There are 45 people who speak Italian and 2 people who speak Romansh.

The age distribution, as of 2009, in Coppet is; 348 children or 12.4% of the population are between 0 and 9 years old and 379 teenagers or 13.5% are between 10 and 19. Of the adult population, 266 people or 9.5% of the population are between 20 and 29 years old. 329 people or 11.7% are between 30 and 39, 499 people or 17.8% are between 40 and 49, and 393 people or 14.0% are between 50 and 59. The senior population distribution is 324 people or 11.6% of the population are between 60 and 69 years old, 193 people or 6.9% are between 70 and 79, there are 69 people or 2.5% who are between 80 and 89, and there are 3 people or 0.1% who are 90 and older.

As of 2000, there were 970 people who were single and never married in the municipality. There were 1,186 married individuals, 89 widows or widowers and 115 individuals who are divorced.

As of 2000, there were 884 private households in the municipality, and an average of 2.5 persons per household. There were 249 households that consist of only one person and 70 households with five or more people. Out of a total of 900 households that answered this question, 27.7% were households made up of just one person and there were 5 adults who lived with their parents. Of the rest of the households, there are 226 married couples without children, 338 married couples with children. There were 58 single parents with a child or children. There were 8 households that were made up of unrelated people and 16 households that were made up of some sort of institution or another collective housing.

In 2000 there were 436 single family homes (or 75.7% of the total) out of a total of 576 inhabited buildings. There were 70 multi-family buildings (12.2%), along with 51 multi-purpose buildings that were mostly used for housing (8.9%) and 19 other use buildings (commercial or industrial) that also had some housing (3.3%).

In 2000, a total of 847 apartments (85.1% of the total) were permanently occupied, while 127 apartments (12.8%) were seasonally occupied and 21 apartments (2.1%) were empty. As of 2009, the construction rate of new housing units was 0 new units per 1000 residents. The vacancy rate for the municipality, in 2010, was 0.08%.

The historical population is given in the following chart:

== Heritage sites of national significance ==
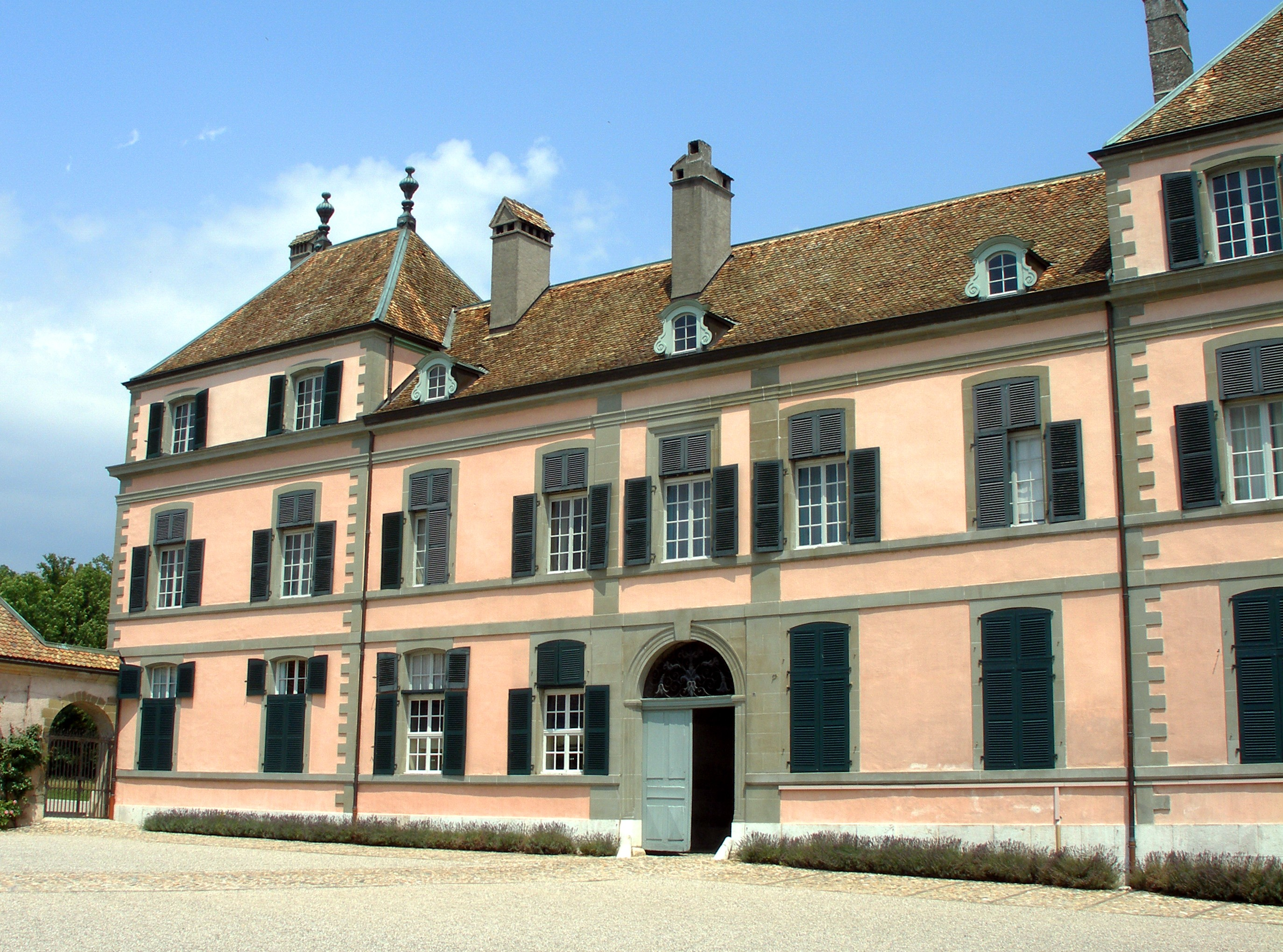
Coppet Castle.

Coppet Castle and the Institut Européen De L’Université De Genève, Centre D’Archives Européennes along with the Temple (former church of the Dominicans) are listed as Swiss heritage site of national significance. The entire small city of Coppet is part of the Inventory of Swiss Heritage Sites.

== Twin Towns ==
Coppet is twinned with the towns of

Calalzo di Cadore, Italy	Maulévrier, France

== Notable residents ==
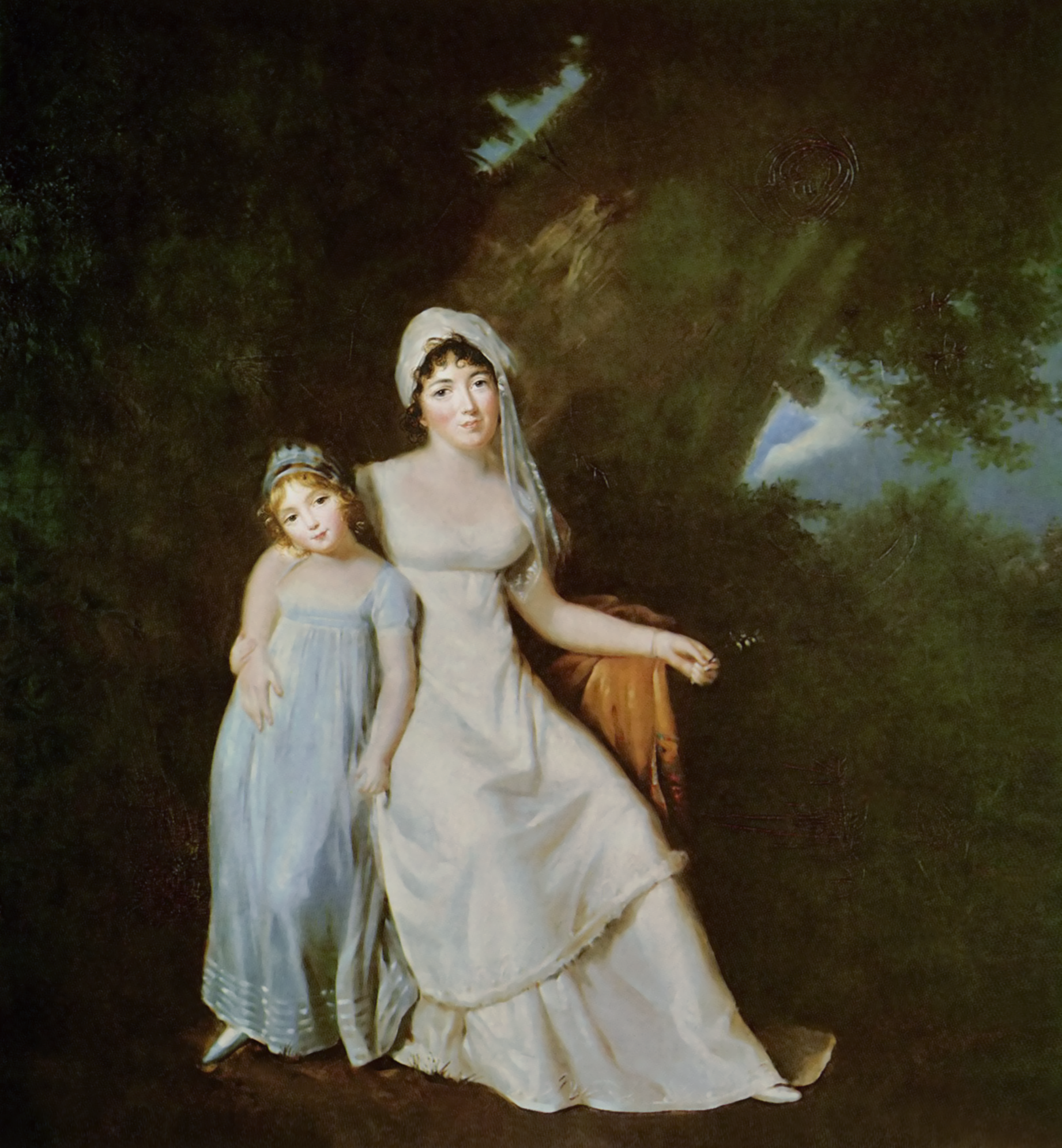
Painting by Marguerite Gérard, Mme de Staël et sa fille (around 1805)

- Alexander zu Dohna-Schlobitten (1661-1728), Prussian field marshal
- Christopher I, Burgrave and Count of Dohna-Schlodien (1665-1733), Prussian general and diplomat
- Suzanne Curchod (1737-1794), Parisian salonnière and wife of Jacques Necker
- Jacques Necker (1732-1804), banker and financier to Louis XVI of France, owner of Coppet Castle
- Madame de Staël (1766–1817) French woman of letters and historian of Genevan origin. Her family, the Neckers took up residence in 1784 at Coppet Castle, later returning to the Paris region
- Kazem Rajavi (1934–1990) an Iranian human rights advocate. He was shot dead whilst driving to his home in Coppet
- Heikki Kovalainen (born 1981), Finnish racing driver
- Timo Glock (born 1982), German racing driver

== Politics ==
In the 2007 federal election the most popular party was the SVP which received 25.31% of the vote. The next three most popular parties were the LPS Party (16.24%), the FDP (14.05%) and the Green Party (13.53%). In the federal election, a total of 643 votes were cast, and the voter turnout was 49.0%.

In the 2019 federal election the most popular party was the Free Democratic Party, receiving 29.4% of the vote, followed by the Swiss People's Party (18.2%), the Green Liberal Party (15.4%), the Socialist Party (14.7%) and the Green Party (14.5%). The number of votes cast was 711, for a voter turnout of 46.3%.

== Economy ==
As of 2010, Coppet had an unemployment rate of 4.4%. As of 2008, there were 4 people employed in the primary economic sector and about 3 businesses involved in this sector. 114 people were employed in the secondary sector and there were 14 businesses in this sector. 676 people were employed in the tertiary sector, with 117 businesses in this sector. There were 1,183 residents of the municipality who were employed in some capacity, of which females made up 43.4% of the workforce.

In 2008 the total number of full-time equivalent jobs was 672. The number of jobs in the primary sector was 3, of which were in agriculture and 3 were in fishing or fisheries. The number of jobs in the secondary sector was 110 of which 49 or (44.5%) were in manufacturing and 60 (54.5%) were in construction. The number of jobs in the tertiary sector was 559. In the tertiary sector; 73 or 13.1% were in wholesale or retail sales or the repair of motor vehicles, 21 or 3.8% were in the movement and storage of goods, 43 or 7.7% were in a hotel or restaurant, 8 or 1.4% were in the information industry, 11 or 2.0% were the insurance or financial industry, 36 or 6.4% were technical professionals or scientists, 76 or 13.6% were in education and 224 or 40.1% were in health care.

In 2000, there were 427 workers who commuted into the municipality and 919 workers who commuted away. The municipality is a net exporter of workers, with about 2.2 workers leaving the municipality for every one entering. About 15.0% of the workforce coming into Coppet are coming from outside Switzerland, while 0.2% of the locals commute out of Switzerland for work. Of the working population, 14.4% used public transportation to get to work, and 70.2% used a private car.

== Religion ==
From the 2000 census, 880 or 37.3% were Roman Catholic, while 703 or 29.8% belonged to the Swiss Reformed Church. Of the rest of the population, there were 25 members of an Orthodox church (or about 1.06% of the population), and there were 90 individuals (or about 3.81% of the population) who belonged to another Christian church. There were 18 individuals (or about 0.76% of the population) who were Jewish, and 52 (or about 2.20% of the population) who were Muslim. There were 12 individuals who were Buddhist, 2 individuals who were Hindu and 2 individuals who belonged to another church. 421 (or about 17.84% of the population) belonged to no church, are agnostic or atheist, and 190 individuals (or about 8.05% of the population) did not answer the question.

== Education ==
In Coppet about 633 or (26.8%) of the population have completed non-mandatory upper secondary education, and 664 or (28.1%) have completed additional higher education (either university or a Fachhochschule). Of the 664 who completed tertiary schooling, 33.6% were Swiss men, 22.7% were Swiss women, 27.3% were non-Swiss men and 16.4% were non-Swiss women.

In the 2009/2010 school year there were a total of 273 students in the Coppet school district. In the Vaud cantonal school system, two years of non-obligatory pre-school are provided by the political districts. During the school year, the political district provided pre-school care for a total of 1,249 children of which 563 children (45.1%) received subsidized pre-school care. The canton's primary school program requires students to attend for four years. There were 154 students in the municipal primary school program. The obligatory lower secondary school program lasts for six years and there were 119 students in those schools.

Coppet is home to the Château de Coppet and the Musée de Coppet. In 2018 the Château de Coppet was visited by 3,167 visitors (the average in the previous three years was 5,988). In 2018 the Musée de Coppet was visited by 680 visitors (the average in the previous three years was 1,188).

As of 2000, there were 616 students in Coppet who came from another municipality, while 267 residents attended schools outside the municipality.
