= Richard Demarco =

Scottish artist (born 1930)

Richard Demarco CBE
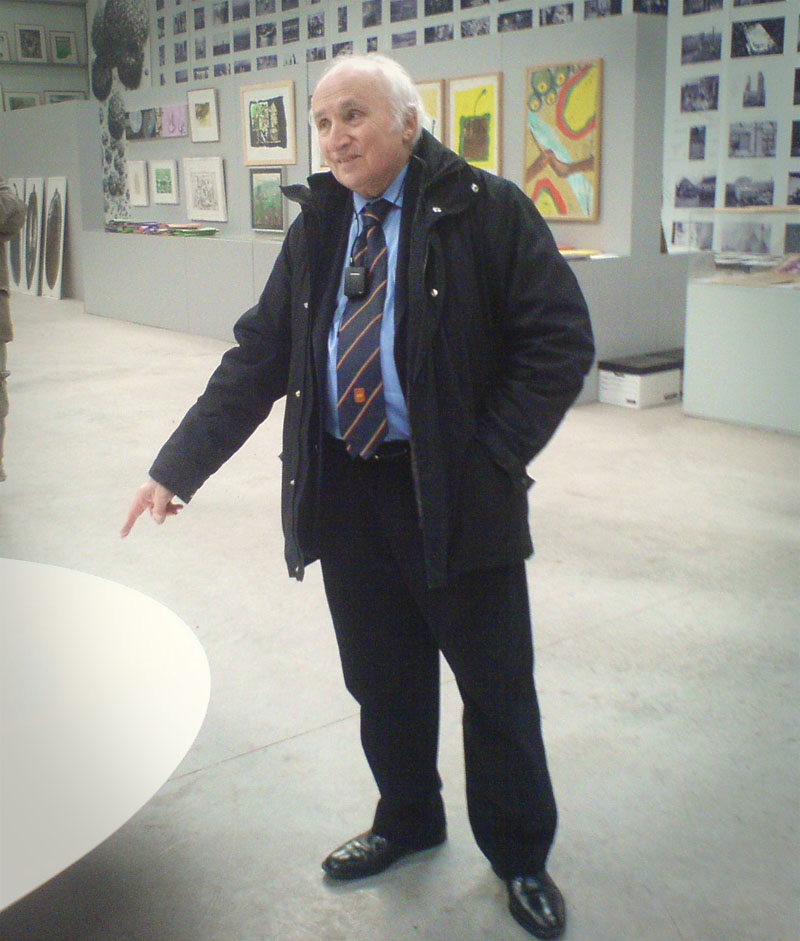
- Demarco in 2009
- Born: 9 July 1930 (age 96); Edinburgh, Scotland
- Education: Holy Cross Academy; Edinburgh College of Art
- Known for: Performance art; installation art
- Relatives: Theodora di Marco (cousin)

Richard Demarco CBE (born 9 July 1930) is a Scottish artist and promoter of the visual and performing arts.

== Early life ==
He was born at 9 Grosvenor Street in Edinburgh on 9 July 1930 the son of Carmino Demarco and his wife Elizabeth Valentina Fusco. His cousin was Theodora di Marco, salonista and viola player. He attended the Holy Cross Academy (now St Augustine's High School) and the Edinburgh College of Art.

== Career ==
=== Richard Demarco Gallery ===
Demarco was a co-founder of the Traverse Theatre in Edinburgh in 1963. Three years later he and other organisers of the theatre's gallery space left the Traverse to establish what became the Richard Demarco Gallery. The gallery, which doubled as a performance venue during the Edinburgh Fringe, ran from 1966 to 1992.

For many years, the Demarco Gallery promoted cultural links with Eastern Europe, both in terms of presenting artists such as Paul Neagu from 1969, Marina Abramović from 1973 and Neue Slowenische Kunst from 1986 within Scotland, organising exhibitions of contemporary Polish, Romanian and Yugoslav art and in establishing outgoing connections for Scottish artists across Europe.

Demarco's involvement with the artist Joseph Beuys led to various presentations, from Strategy Get Arts in 1970 to Beuys' hunger strike during the Jimmy Boyle Days in 1980.

Also particularly notable were the presentations by Tadeusz Kantor's Cricot 2 group during the 1970s and 1980s, including a celebrated unofficial performance of The Water Hen at the former Edinburgh poorhouse during the 1972 Edinburgh Festival. Cricot 2 returned to Edinburgh in later years. Demarco introduced Beuys and Kantor to one another and in one performance of Lovelies and Dowdies Beuys performed under Kantor's direction.

For many years, after the Scottish Arts Council withdrew its annual grant in 1980 following controversy associated with Joseph Beuys' support for Jimmy Boyle, the Demarco Gallery led a financially straitened existence. Since the early 1990s, Richard Demarco's activity has continued under the auspices of the Demarco European Art Foundation.

In November 2008 a substantial selection from Demarco's archives, covering the period 1963–1980, was made available on-line by the University of Dundee [see below for direct link to online archive]. Images of Demarco's activities during this period, in particular collaborations with Joseph Beuys, Tadeusz Kantor, Paul Neagu and Marina Abramović are available in the selection from the Demarco archives. Detailed documentation of the Edinburgh Arts journeys from 1972 to 1980 are also available in this selection.

Demarco has presented several thousand art exhibitions, plays, music, conferences, and various other performances, mainly in Edinburgh, involving artists from at least sixty countries, including all of central and eastern Europe during the Cold War, North and South America, all countries of western Europe, Australasia, and from Southern Africa, Middle East, and other parts of Asia. Exhibitions and festival programmes were also organised by him and his Demarco European Arts Foundation in other countries including Poland, Lithuania, Croatia, Bosnia, Malta, Georgia, Hungary, Italy to name but a few. His 'Edinburgh Arts' journeys criss-crossed all of Europe, taking artists and academics from other countries alongside those of Scotland to visit interesting people, great collections, cities, landscapes, and events, to examine Europe's cultural history of the past 5,000 years. It is for his consistent internationalism that he was being successfully nominated as European Citizen of the Year 2013. This also followed from his exhibition "Scotland in Europe: Europe in Scotland" in Brussels in 2011. His own artworks were included in the Italian pavilion of the 2011 Venice Biennale. In 2013 Demarco organised an Italo-Scottish pavilion at the Venice Biennale, his fourth pavilion there.

=== Edinburgh Festival ===
Richard Demarco has attended every Edinburgh Festival and mounted arts programmes in most of them including major art exhibitions for the Edinburgh International Festival, also called the 'official festival'. He has been extensively involved with the Edinburgh Festival Fringe since its inception, while also being highly critical of it in recent decades for delivering too much shallow entertainment in what is the largest arts festival in the world with over 3,500 productions and 40,000 performances every August. Over the years he has put on a wide variety of challenging theatre productions, art exhibitions and other cultural events. Many of the artists, actors, directors, musicians, film makers who first appeared outside their home countries at his Edinburgh festival venues subsequently became world-renowned such as Tadeusz Kantor, Yvette Bozsik, and Marina Abramović.

The gallery venue was never run for profit; many performers were allowed to put on productions or exhibit at little or no cost. And Demarco himself has been no stranger to artistic and commercial risks. For instance, in 1995, his venue hosted a group of artists flown out from the then besieged city of Sarajevo alongside an opera installation by the young Damien Hirst.

During the Cold War Demarco crossed the Iron Curtain 100 times bringing hundreds of artists and arts groups out of Central and Eastern Europe to perform at the Edinburgh Festival. His programs of more than 1,000 art exhibitions and several thousand performing arts productions, and have included artists from more than 60 countries. His ethos is to remain faithful to the founding principle of the Edinburgh Festival, which is to heal the wounds of war through the languages of the arts.

No stranger to media controversy, Demarco has challenged successive Fringe organisers' boundaries by staging festival productions outside Edinburgh. These have included a full costume, full length production of Shakespeare's Macbeth staged on Inchcolm Island in the Firth of Forth.

He remains a controversial figure particularly due to his constant emphasis on the importance of recalling festival history and high art values however avant-garde. His approach has not always sat easily with the Scottish arts establishment as the Fringe has become increasingly driven by commercial considerations that led to over-dominance of the Comedy Festival in the Edinburgh fringe.

From 1999, Demarco's involvement at the Fringe was in collaboration with Rocket Venues founder Xela Batchelder, as Demarco-Rocket Productions. In 2003, Rocket Venues took over the Roxy (also sometimes known as the Demarco Roxy) Art House, a converted church on the corner of Roxburgh Place and Drummond Street on the South Side of Edinburgh, previously used by the Pleasance Theatre (Pleasance Over-the-Road). In 2008 the building was sold to another organisation, who doubled the rent and subsequently left Rocket Venues without a home. Richard Demarco and Xela Batchelder (now a full-time Associate Professor) still collaborate on educational and festival type projects, but on a smaller scale.

Since the 2011 festival, moving from Craigcrook Castle, Demarco's new home for his archives, exhibitions, theatre and other events is Summerhall at the East end of The Meadows, Edinburgh Southside, Europe's largest private multi-arts centre where 1,300 productions including over 100 art shows are staged annually. Summerhall was for a century the Royal (Dick) School of Veterinary Studies until purchased from Edinburgh University in November 2011 by buyers closely associated with Demarco over many years. The veterinary school moved to a new campus outside the city at Easter Bush.

== Writing ==
Demarco was a regular contributor to ArtReview, then titled Arts Review throughout the 1980s.

== Honours and awards ==
Previously appointed as an OBE, he was raised to a CBE in the New Year Honours List in December 2006. In 1976, Richard Demarco received a Gold Medal from the Polish government and in 1986, he was made a Cavaliere of the Italian Republic. In 1992 he received the Witkacy Prize. In 2012 he received gold medals simultaneously from both Germany and Poland following a major retrospective entitled Ten Dialogues at the Royal Scottish Academy. Later in the same year he received a gold medal from Romania and another from the Culture Minister of Poland in Warsaw. He has been awarded honorary doctorates by universities in Europe and North America and, from 1993 to 2000, he was Professor of European Culture at the University of Kingston. He received the European Citizen's Medal on Monday 19 August 2013, in a ceremony held at the European Parliament Office, Brussels, the only UK citizen and only arts person receiving this honour. Also, in 2013, Demarco was featured in an episode of the BBC's The Culture Show hosted by Sue Perkins. The episode celebrated the 50th anniversary of the Traverse Theatre. On Monday 24 March 2014, Demarco received an engraved Loving Cup from Edinburgh City Council presented by the Lord Provost in the City Chambers. At the ceremony, Ron Butlin, the Edinburgh Makar, recited a poem commissioned especially for the occasion. An impression of Demarco's handprints has been immortalised on a flagstone in the City Chambers quadrangle alongside previous Edinburgh Award recipients Ian Rankin, JK Rowling, George Kerr, Sir Chris Hoy, Professor Peter Higgs and Elizabeth Blackadder.
