= Theodora di Marco =

Salonista and viola player, founded Edinburgh Chamber Orchestra

Theodora di Marco (14 October 1925 – 17 August 2021), also known as Theo, was a Scottish-Italian salonista and viola player, a founder of the Edinburgh Chamber Orchestra, one of the oldest amateur orchestras in Scotland.

== Life ==
Born to an Italian restaurant and confectionery shop owner in Edinburgh on 14 October 1925, with her twin sister Norma, who was a cellist and an editor and public relations executive on Arab affairs; Theo was also a cousin to the artist and promoter of cultural events, Richard Demarco, CBE. She and her twin Norma graduated from the University of Edinburgh.

The di Marco sisters launched the Edinburgh Chamber Orchestra, of twenty amateur musicians at Pollock Halls, on 13 March 1946, in aid of the International Students Service.

== Edinburgh Chamber Orchestra, first concert ==
The concert was conducted by Claire Spence, and consisted of:

- Arison Concerto in E minor
- Mozart Eine kleine Nacht musik
- Peter Warlock Capriole Suite
- Vivaldi Cello Concerto in D Major
- Serenade (premier) by Hans Gal, who conducted the piece

== Career ==
After teaching in private schools with her sister in Switzerland and then Oxford, in 1953 di Marco became a Carmelite nun, a closed order, which she served for 30 years at St. Peter's Convent, Edinburgh.

The convent closed in 1983, and she joined her sister in London, hosting musical soirées, in their home in 10 Pembroke Road, Notting Hill, where Norma protested that a gambling site was to be opened.

Norma di Marco at protest

Norma died in 2009.

Di Marco died on 17 August 2021, after years of lively hosting or entertaining musical and debating soirees, according to Richard Demarco 'Theo’s love of music along with her “feisty” spirit shone through right to the end.'
