= Coppet group =

19th century French intellectual circle

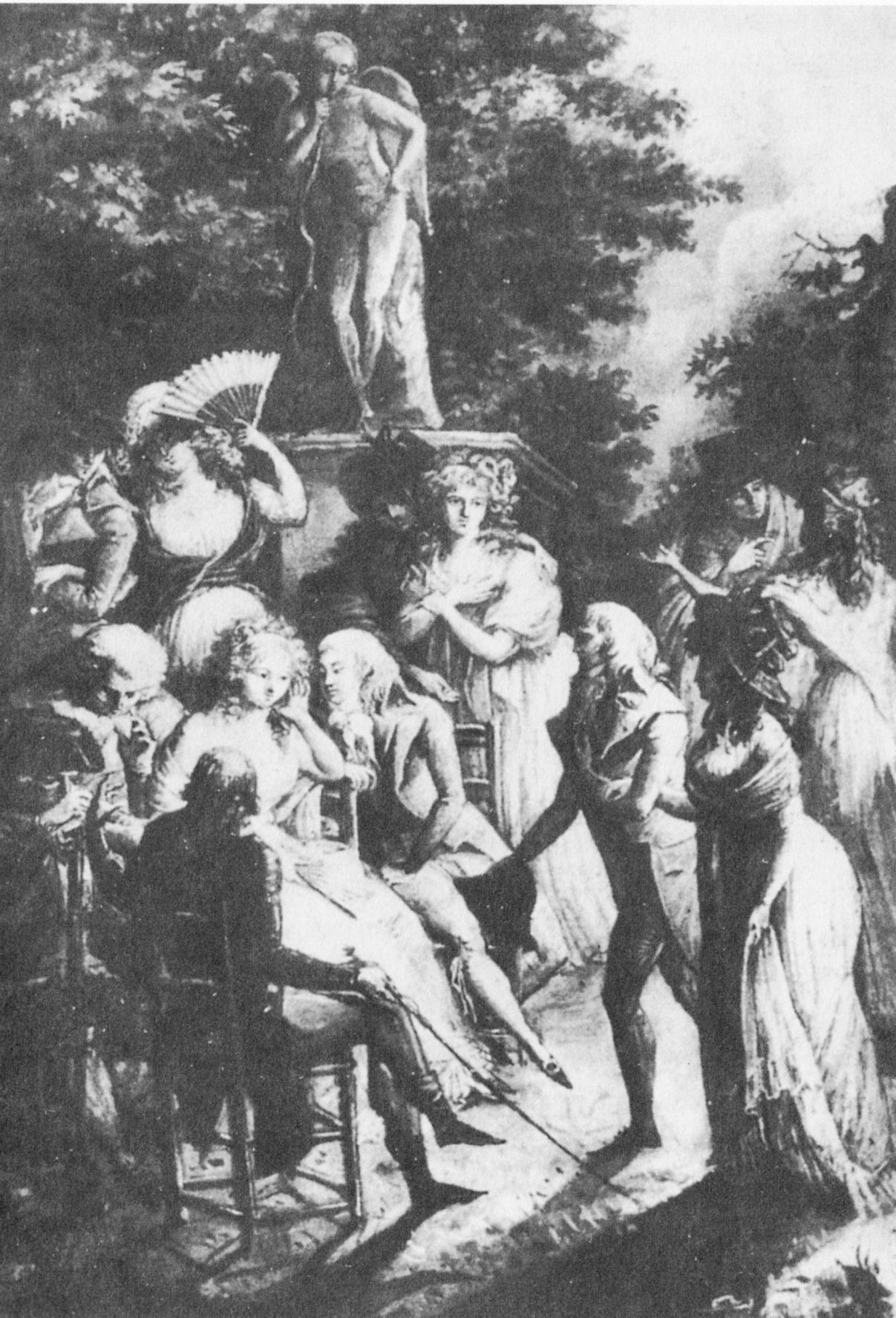
Madame de Stael et le groupe de Coppet

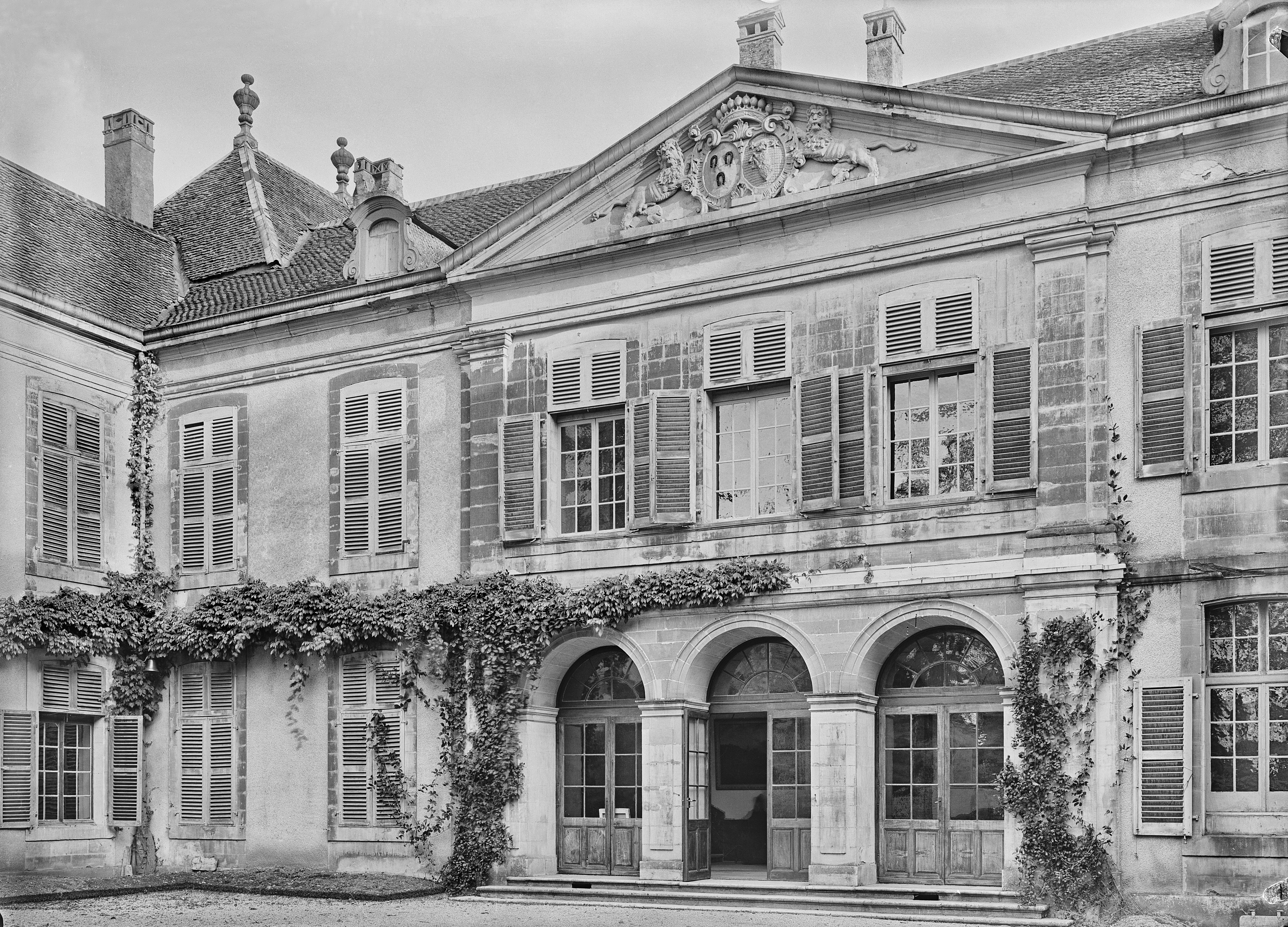
Château de Coppet in 1905

The Coppet group (Groupe de Coppet), also known as the Coppet circle, was an informal intellectual and literary gathering centred on Germaine de Staël during the time period between the establishment of the Napoleonic First Empire (1804) and the Bourbon Restoration of 1814–1815. The name comes from Coppet Castle in Switzerland.

The group, which broadly continued the activities of Madame de Staël's previous salons, had a considerable influence on the development of nineteenth century liberalism and romanticism. Stendhal referred to the Coppet guests as "the Estates General of European opinion."

== Participants ==
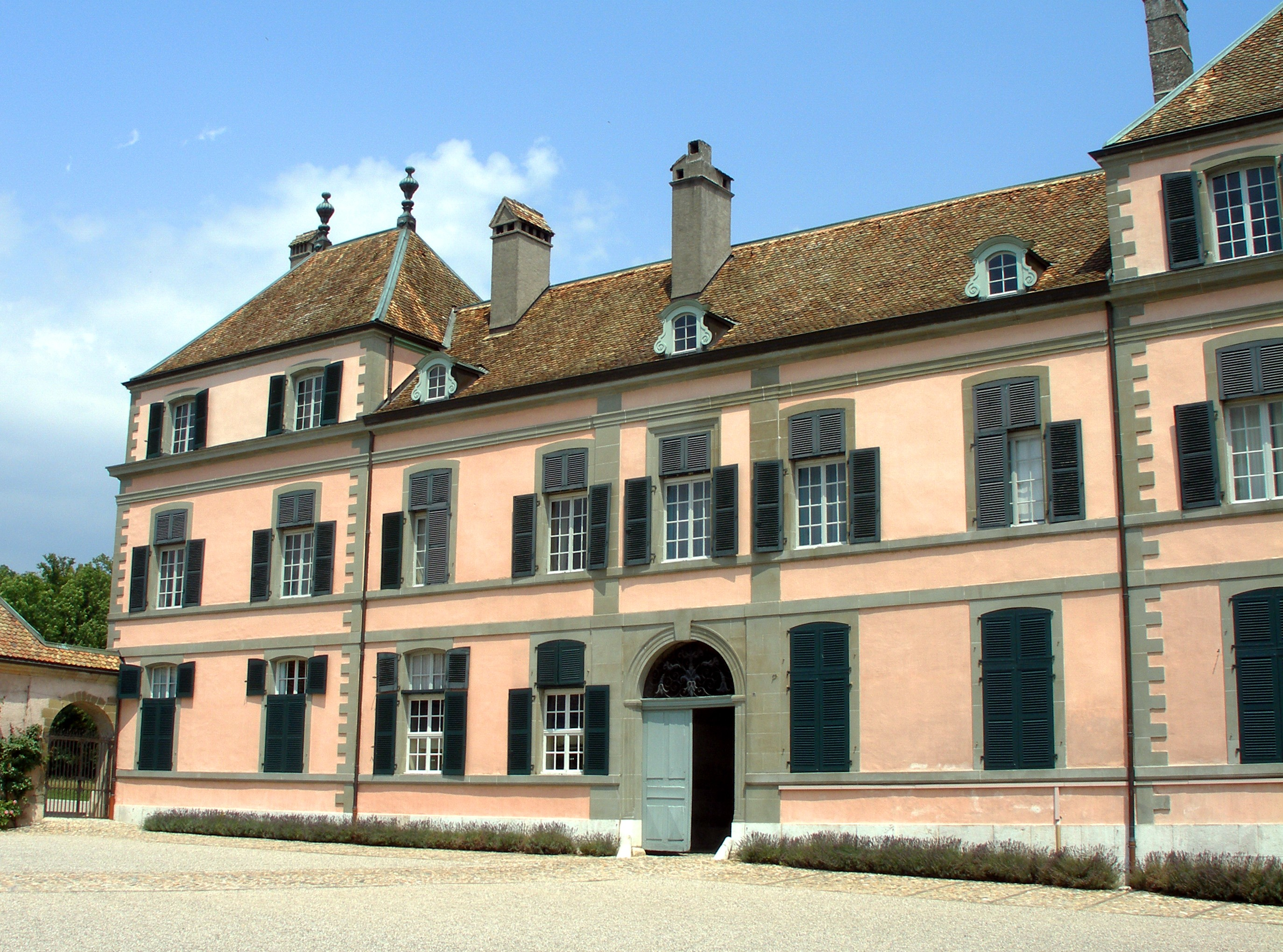
Coppet Castle in Switzerland

Around the core group which consisted of the hosts at Coppet Castle, the Necker family, that is Jacques Necker and his daughter, Germaine de Staël and her long time lover, Benjamin Constant, with her cousin by marriage, Albertine Necker de Saussure, Wilhelm von Humboldt, Jean de Sismondi, Charles Victor de Bonstetten, Prosper de Barante, Mathieu de Montmorency and August Wilhelm Schlegel, there was a stream of international men and women visitors of influence.

These included:

- Ernestine von Arco, madame Maximilian von Montgelas
- Odilon Barrot
- Louis de Beaupoil de Saint-Aulaire
- Andrew Bell
- Wilhelmine von Biron von Kurland, Herzogin von Sagan
- Claude Ignace de Barante
- Joseph Bonaparte
- Ludovico di Breme
- Victor de Broglie
- Sir Henry Brougham, 1st Baron Brougham and Vaux
- Friederike Brun
- Lord Byron
- John Campbell, 1st Marquess of Breadalbane
- Adelbert von Chamisso
- François-René de Chateaubriand
- Carl von Clausewitz
- Jean-Barthélémy Le Couteulx de Canteleu (1749–1818)
- Humphry Davy
- Jane Davy, born Kerr
- Etienne Dumont
- Mary Elliot
- Sarah Sophia Fane, Countess of Jersey
- Marc Etienne Frossard (1757–1815)
- David François Gaudot (1756–1836)
- Jean-Antoine Gauvin, dit Gallois (1761–1828)
- Charles de Gentil de Langalerie (1751–1835)
- Joseph Marie de Gérando
- François Guizot
- Emma, Lady Hamilton
- Frederic-Cesar de La Harpe
- John Cam Hobhouse
- Claude Hochet
- Charles Huchet de La Bédoyère
- Carolina Friederica von Humboldt
- Countess Dorota Barbara Jablonowska, Madame Józef Klemens Czartoryski
- Camille Jordan
- Arnail François, marquis de Jaucourt
- Count Viktor Kochubey
- Madame de Krüdener
- Alexandre de Laborde
- Alphonse de Lamartine
- Matthew Gregory Lewis
- Aline Lugo
- Jacob Frédéric Lullin de Châteauvieux
- Sir James Mackintosh
- Louis Manuel
- Friedrich von Matthisson
- Luise von Matthisson
- Jakob Heinrich Meister
- Francesco Melzi d'Eril
- Dorothea Mendelssohn
- John Izard Middleton
- Johannes von Müller
- Alexis de Noville
- Adam Gottlob Oehlenschläger
- Henry Petty-Fitzmaurice, 3rd Marquess of Lansdowne
- Charles Pictet de Rochemont
- Alfonso Pignatelli de Aragon
- Gennaro Pignatelli, principe di Belmonte
- John William Polidori
- Stanisław Kostka Potocki
- Jan Potocki
- Prince Augustus of Prussia
- Charles-Victor Prévot, vicomte d'Arlincourt
- Juliette Récamier
- Guillaume Anne de Constant Rebecque, seigneur de Villars (1750–1832)
- François Dominique de Reynaud, Comte de Montlosier
- Adolph Ribbing
- Carl Ritter
- Albert de Rocca
- Samuel Rogers and his sister Sarah
- Sir Samuel Romilly
- Elzéar de Sabran (1774-1846)
- Aleksander Antoni Sapieha
- Pedro de Sousa Holstein, 1st Duke of Palmela
- Spalding sisters
- Jean-Baptiste-Antoine Suard
- Christian Friedrich Tieck
- Prince Pyotr Tyufyakin
- Henry Vassall-Fox, 3rd Baron Holland
- Zacharias Werner
- Charles de Villers
- George Child Villiers, 5th Earl of Jersey
- Élisabeth Vigée Le Brun
- Caspar Voght
- Maria Edgeworth

== See also ==
- Club de l'Entresol
