= Charles Babbage's Saturday night soirées =

Saturday night social gatherings held by inventor Charles Babbage in the 1830s

Charles Babbage's Saturday night soirées were gatherings held by the mathematician and inventor Charles Babbage at his home in Dorset Street, Marylebone, London from 1828 and into the 1840s. The soirées were attended by the cultural elite of the time.

== Scientific soirées ==
Babbage left England when his wife and father died in 1827. On his return in 1828, now in possession of a considerable inheritance, he began to host Saturday evening parties. The science historian James A. Secord describes the parties as "scientific soirées". Secord writes that Babbage imported the idea from France, and once established, such soirées "became one of the chief ways in which scientific discussion could take place on a more sustained basis within polite society."

In her autobiography, the English writer and sociologist Harriet Martineau wrote: "All were eager to go to his glorious soirées and I always thought he appeared to great advantage as a host. His patience in explaining his machine in those days was really exemplary."

According to biographers Bruce Collier and James H. MacLachlan, "Babbage was a bon vivant with a love of dining out and socialising. He sparkled as a host and raconteur. His Saturday soirées were glittering events attended by the social and intellectual elite of London."

== Guests ==
Hundreds of prominent people attended the soirées, including Ada Lovelace, Lady Byron, Arthur Wellesley, 1st Duke of Wellington, Charles Darwin and Emma Darwin, Charles Dickens, Michael Faraday, Sophia Elizabeth De Morgan, Mary Somerville, Harriet Martineau, photographic inventor Henry Fox Talbot, the actor William Macready, the composer Felix Mendelssohn, the historian Thomas Babington Macaulay, telegraph inventor Charles Wheatstone, the French philosopher Alexis de Tocqueville, geologist Charles Lyell and his wife Mary Lyell, Mary's sister Frances, the Belgian ambassador Sylvain Van de Weyer, electrical inventor Andrew Crosse and many others. According to C. R. Keeler, up to 200-300 people might attend one evening event.

== Attractions ==
A demo of Babbage's unfinished Difference engine was on display for guests at some of the gatherings. He also displayed a mechanical dancer. In her autobiography, Harriet Martineau describes Babbage's disappointment at his guests being more interested in this dancing doll - a toy - than in his demo of a computing machine.

== Influence ==
Ada Lovelace (then Ada Byron) first met Charles Babbage when her mother took her to one of his soirées on 5 June 1833, and the meeting led to a lifelong friendship and collaboration, culminating in Lovelace's notes on the Analytical engine.
