= Coppet Castle =

Castle in Coppet, Switzerland

- Château de Coppet
- Coppet in Switzerland
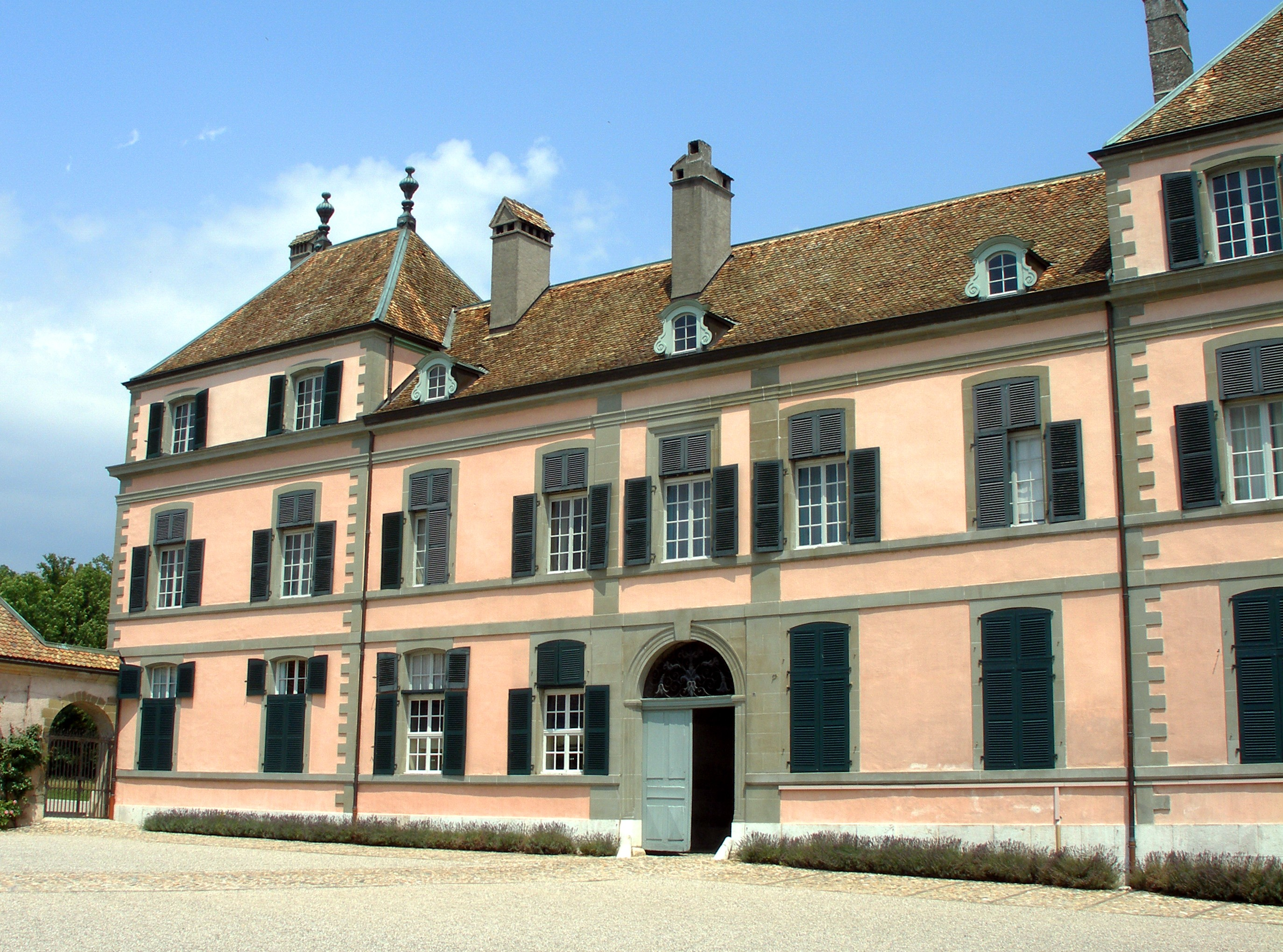
- South façade of Coppet Castle

Site information
- Type: Château

Location
- Coordinates: 46°18′57″N 6°11′35″E

Site history
- Built: 14th century

Swiss Cultural Property of National Significance

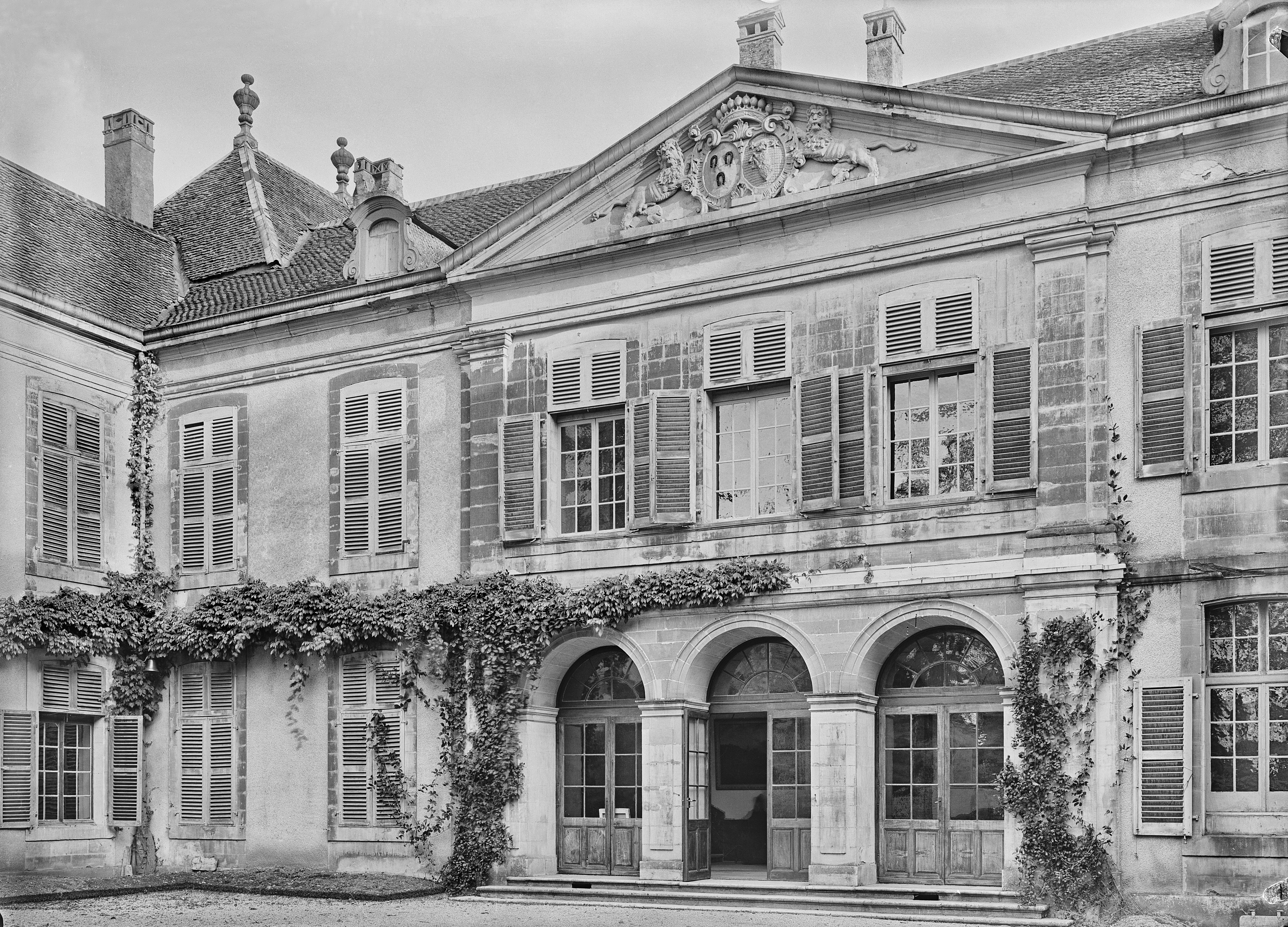
Château de Coppet in 1905

Coppet Castle (French: Château de Coppet) is a château in the municipality of Coppet of the Canton of Vaud in Switzerland. It is a Swiss heritage site of national significance.

It gave its name to the celebrated group of several dozen early 19th-century intellectuals from the whole of Europe, the so-called Coppet group, who met there (c. 1805–1816) under the aegis of Madame de Staël and made signal contributions to literature, philosophy and politics.

== People born in Coppet Castle ==
- Alexander zu Dohna-Schlobitten (1661–1728), Prussian field marshal
- Christopher I, Burgrave and Count of Dohna-Schlodien (1665–1733), Prussian general and diplomat

== See also ==
- List of castles in Switzerland
- Château
- Coppet group
