= Bory =

Bory may refer to:

== Places ==
- Bory (Žďár nad Sázavou District), a municipality in the Czech Republic
- Bory, a part of Plzeň in the Czech Republic, and a prison situated there
- Bory, Levice District, a municipality and village in Slovakia

== People ==
- Alphonse Bory (1838–1891), Swiss politician and President of the Swiss Council of States
- David Bory (born 1976), French retired rugby union player
- Jean-Louis Bory (1919–1979), French writer, journalist and film critic
- Jean-Marc Bory (1934–2001), Swiss actor
- Jenő Bory (1879–1959), Hungarian architect and sculptor
- Bory de Bori és Borfői, a Hungarian noble family
- "Bory", a nickname of P. G. T. Beauregard (1818–1893), Confederate general during the American Civil War

== Other uses ==
- Bory, author abbreviation of Jean Baptiste Bory de Saint-Vincent (1778–1846), French naturalist
- French frigate Commandant Bory, a French frigate launched in 1958

== See also ==
- Bori (disambiguation)
- Borie (disambiguation)
