= Borie =

Borie may refer to:

- USS Borie (DD-215), a Clemson-class destroyer in the United States Navy during World War II
- USS Borie (DD-704), an Allen M. Sumner-class destroyer in the United States Navy

== People with the surname ==
- Adolph E. Borie (1809–1880), United States merchant and politician
- André Borie (died 1971), French civil engineer
- Françoise Borie (born 1947), French former swimmer
- Philibert Borie (1759–1832), French physician and Mayor of Paris
- Pierre Dumoulin-Borie (1808–1838), French Catholic missionary priest and member of the Paris Foreign Missions Society
- Ryerson, Mrs. Emily Maria (née Borie) (1863–1939), American passenger who survived the sinking of RMS Titanic

== See also ==
- Bori (disambiguation)
- Bory (disambiguation)
