= Bori =

Bori may refer to:

== Places ==
- Borim or Bori, a town in Goa, India
- Bori, Benin, a town
- Bori, Nagpur, a town in India
- Bori, Parbhani, a town in India
- Bori City, a city in Nigeria
- Loralai, also known as Bori, a city in Balochistan, Pakistan
- Bori Wildlife Sanctuary in Madhya Pradesh, India

== People ==
- Gábor Bori (born 1984), Hungarian footballer
- Lucrezia Bori (1887–1960), Spanish opera singer
- Mariano Bori (1893–1966), Spanish footballer
- Pier Cesare Bori, (1937-2012), Italian professor

== Other uses ==
- Bori (film), a 2020 South Korean film
- Bori (food), a dried lentil dumpling in Bengali cuisine
- Bori people of Arunachal Pradesh, India
- Bori language, spoken by the Bori people
- Bori (religion), a Hausa possession cult, dance, and music tradition in West Africa
- Bhandarkar Oriental Research Institute, known in short as BORI
- Bori, an 1894 meteorite fall in India
- Bori, a Slovenian tractor manufacturer

== See also ==
- Borie (disambiguation)
- Bory (disambiguation)
- Boria (disambiguation)
- Bora (disambiguation)
