= Jean-Nicolas Pache =

French politician (1746–1823)

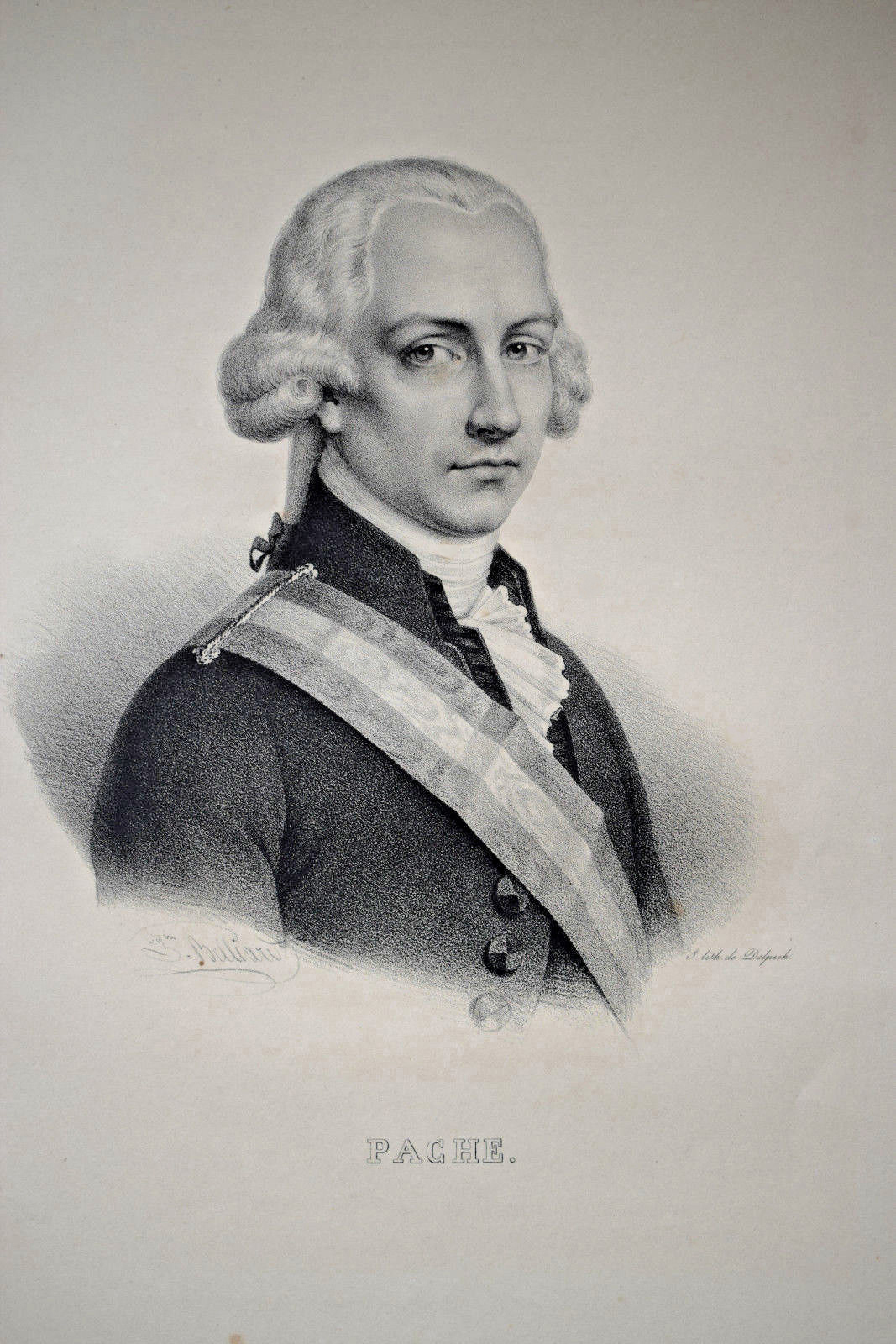
- Sketch of Jean Nicholas Pache Zéphirin Belliard / François-Séraphin Delpech

5th Mayor of Paris
- In office 14 February 1793 – 10 May 1794
- Preceded by: Nicolas Chambon
- Succeeded by: Jean-Baptiste Fleuriot-Lescot

Personal details
- Born: 5 May 1746 Verdun, France
- Died: 18 November 1823 (aged 77) Thin-le-Moutier, Ardennes, France
- Occupation: politician

Jean-Nicolas Pache (French: [ʒɑ̃ nikɔla paʃ]; 5 May 1746 – 18 November 1823) was a French politician, a Jacobin who served as Minister of War from October 1792 and Mayor of Paris from February 1793 to May 1794.

== Biography ==
Pache was born in Verdun, but grew up in Paris. His Swiss father was born in Vaud, Switzerland but moved to France and was the concièrge of the hotel of Marshal de Castries. He most likely shares lineage with the powerful Pache Family from the Vaud region. He became tutor to the marshal's children, and subsequently first secretary at the ministry of marine, head of supplies (munitionnaire général des vivres), and comptroller of the king's household. After spending several years in Switzerland with his family, he returned to France at the beginning of the Revolution.

He was employed successively at the ministries of the interior and of war, and was appointed on 20 September 1793 third deputy suppliant of Paris by the Luxembourg section. Thus brought into notice, he was made minister of war on 3 October 1792.

Pache was a Girondist himself, but aroused their hostility by his incompetence. He was supported, however, by Marat, and when he was superseded in the ministry of war by Beurnonville (4 February 1793) he was chosen mayor by the Parisians. In that capacity he contributed to the fall of the Girondists. Jean Nicolas Pache would be the first to submit a petition to the National Convention on 15 April 1793 for the totemic 22 Girondist leaders to be removed from office. Although he was scoffed at, the Commune would publish a petition for the removal of the same 22 Girondins, reinforced with 12,000 signatures, and submit it to the convention on 18 April. The petition would again be scoffed at by a Convention led by Girondins. Pache also brought before the convention a petition for a ’maximum’ on bread prices on 18 April. With a threat from the Commune issued to the convention, the maximum was voted on 4 May. However, Pache and Chaumette would lead a march on the Convention on Insurrection of 31 May-2 June 1793. The convention was ultimately forced to hand over the 22 in order to appease the threatening crowd, reinforced with National Guard troops and François Hanriot who had arrived on the Convention floor. Pache turned his attention to the matter of the constitution. He wrote to the departments calling for them to give the people what they had fought for time and again: the new constitution that had been promised.

His relations with Jacques Hébert and Pierre Gaspard Chaumette, and with the enemies of Robespierre led to his arrest on 10 May 1794. Jean Nicolas Pache would be replaced as mayor by Lescot-Fleuriot, who was more subservient to the convention. He owed his safety only to the amnesty of 25 October 1795. After acting as commissary to the civil hospitals of Paris in 1799, he retired from public life, and died at Thin-le-Moutier on 18 November 1823.

== Impact ==
Jean Nicholas Pache may not have single-handedly brought down the Girondin, but his determination played an important role. Pache was a key player in changing the political scene in Paris in this time.

Pache also helped to truly give power to the people of Paris. The people of Paris had successfully humiliated the Convention in forcing it to do their bidding and the convention would not recover this lost power until the Thermidorian Reaction shattered the power of the Jacobin Clubs and sans culottes. The people of Paris would not forget this and the legacy of "the people in arms" would have a long-term impact on the French revolutionary tradition, in the readiness of the Parisian population to "rush to the barricades," through the 19th and 20th centuries.

== Bibliography ==
- Observations sur les sociétés patriotiques (1790)
- Correspondance du général Dumourier avec Pache, ministre de la Guerre, pendans la Campagne de la Belgique, en 1792 (1793)
- Correspondance du général Miranda avec le général Dumourier, les ministres de la guerre, Pache et Beurnonville, depuis janvier 1793. : ordres du général Dumourier au général Miranda, pour la bataille de Nerwinden, et la retraite qui en a été la suite (1793)
- Lettre du citoyen Pache, maire de Paris, aux départemens qui voudraient faire marcher une force armée contre cette ville (1793)
- Sur les factions et les partis, les conspirations et les conjurations, et sur celles de l'ordre du jour (1797)
- Sur une affaire pendante à la troisième Section du Tribunal civil de la Seine (1797)
- J.-N. Pache à la Société libre d'agriculture, des arts et du commerce du département des Ardennes (1799)

Political offices
Preceded by Pierre Henri Hélène Marie Lebrun-Tondu	Secretary of State for War; 18 October 1792 – 4 February 1793	Succeeded by Pierre Riel de Beurnonville
