= René Boucher =

French magistrate and revolutionary

4th Mayor of Paris
- In office 15 October 1792 – 2 December 1792
- Preceded by: Philibert Borie
- Succeeded by: Henri Lefèvre d'Ormesson

Personal details
- Born: 1732 Paris, France
- Died: 1811 (age 79) Paris, France
- Occupation: magistrate, politician

Antoine René Boucher (1732–1811), more commonly known as René Boucher, was a French magistrate and a French revolutionary who served as Mayor of Paris in 1792.
