= 2021 French Socialist Party presidential primary =

14 October 2021 event

- 14 October 2021
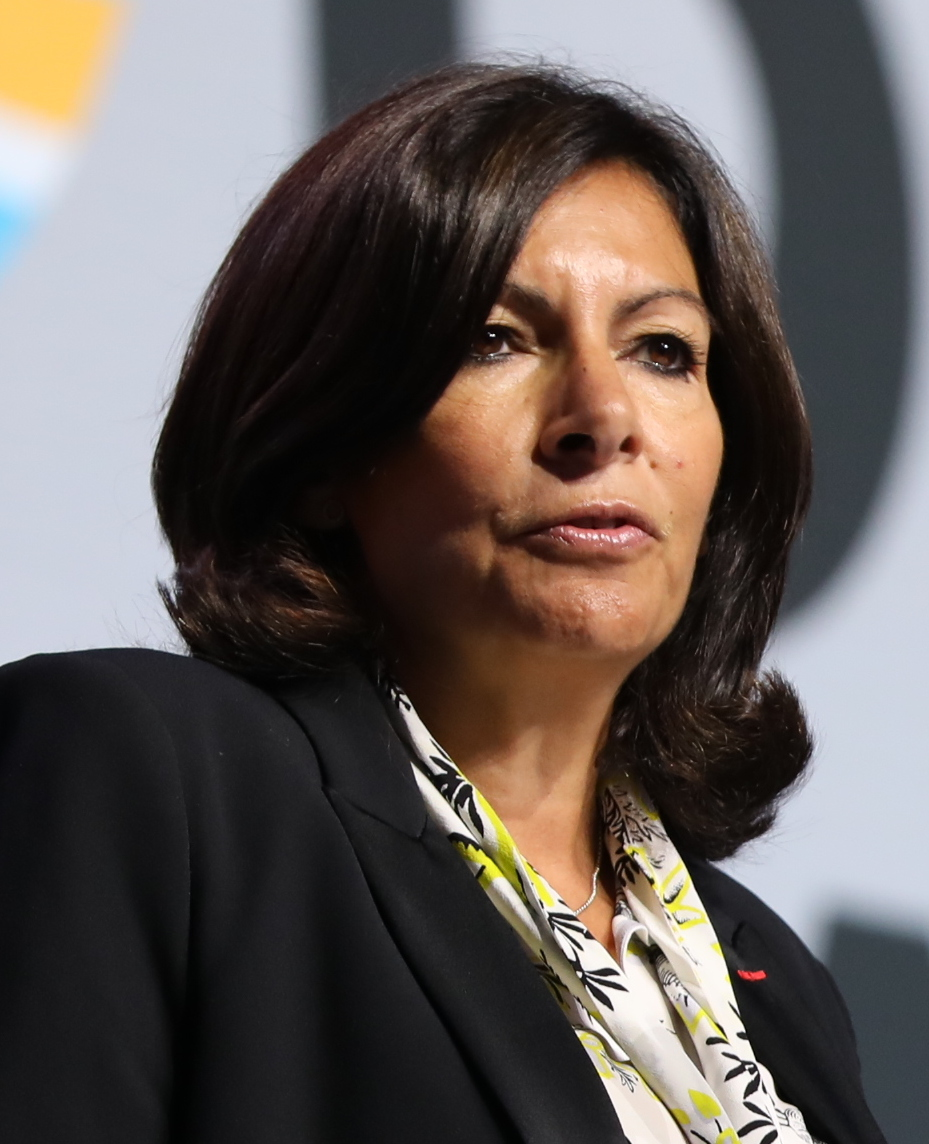

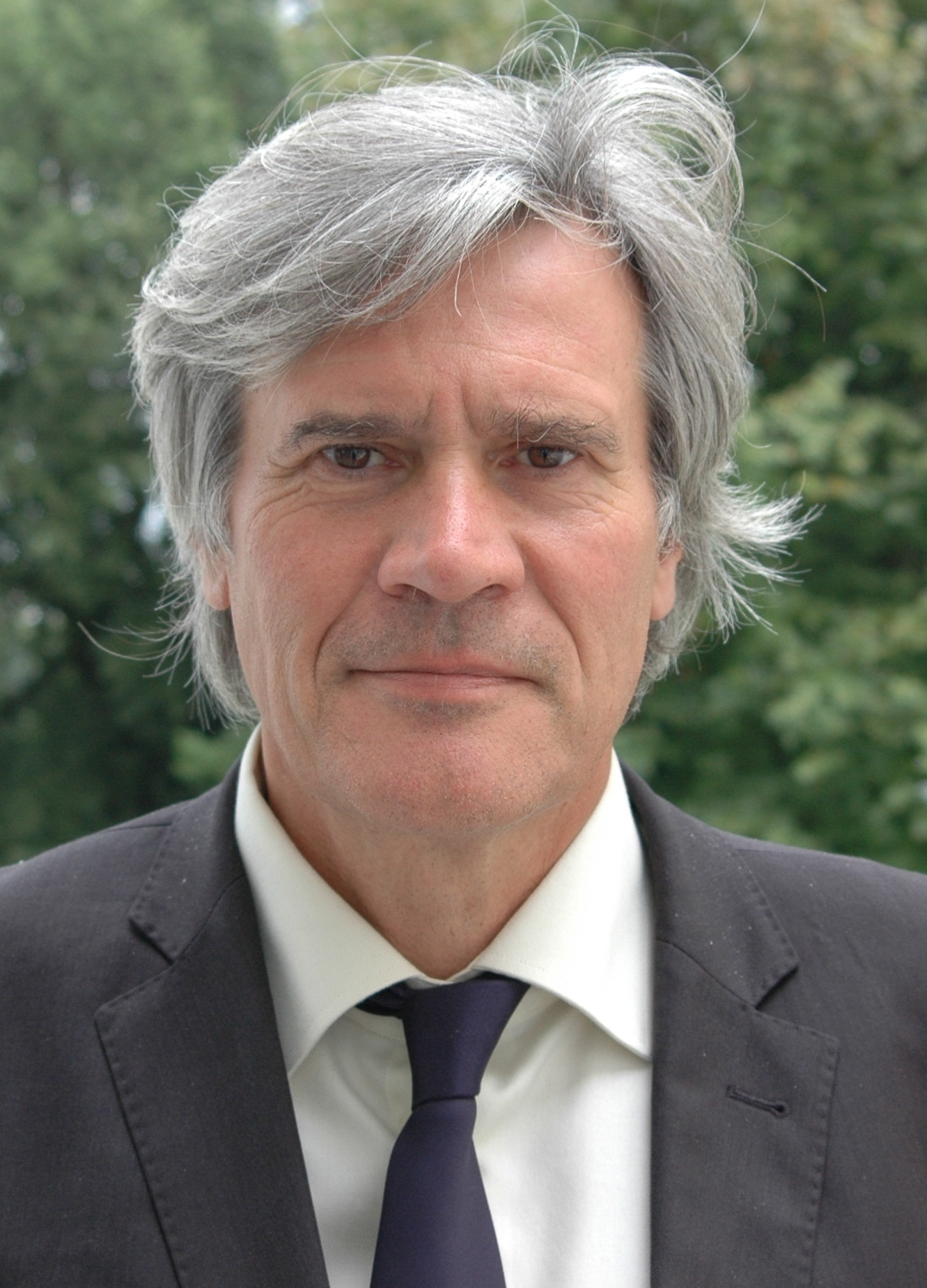
Candidate	Anne Hidalgo	Stéphane Le Foll
Party	PS	PS
Popular vote	15,208	5,741
Percentage	72.60%	27.40%

The 2021 French Socialist Party presidential primary takes place on 14 October 2021 to choose the Socialist Party candidate for the 2022 French presidential election. The vote saw the victory of the mayor of Paris, Anne Hidalgo, in the first round with more than 70% of the vote. Unlike those of 2011 and 2017, this was an internal party consultation.

== Background ==
Since Benoît Hamon's defeat in the 2017 French presidential election, the Socialist Party has suffered a series of setbacks and internal divisions. Following the 2017 French legislative election, the Socialist Party (PS) held only 31 seats the National Assembly, compared to approximately ten times that number in the previous legislature. These members sat within a parliamentary group in the National Assembly renamed the New Left. Manuel Valls himself left the PS and joined the LREM group as an affiliated member. On 1 July 2017, Benoît Hamon founded the movement, Génération.s. For her part, Élisabeth Guigou, a former member of parliament who had just retired from political life, criticized this decision and offered Bernard Cazeneuve the leadership of the refounded and renamed party, which would retain the socialist name. In January 2018, Stéphane Le Foll, Luc Carvounas, Olivier Faure and Emmanuel Maurel emerged as candidates for the First Secretary of the Socialist Party. The first round of this internal election takes place on Thursday 15 March 2018. This election saw the victory of Olivier Faure, head of the Socialist group in the National Assembly.

In preparation for the 2019 European elections, the party's national council designated essayist and co-founder of Place Publique (PP), Raphaël Glucksmann , as its lead candidate. This was the first time in European elections that the Socialist Party (PS) had not fielded its own list and the first time since 1971 that the party had allowed one of its partners to head the list on which it participated. In protest against this list, several prominent figures, including Stéphane Le Foll and Ségolène Neuville, resigned from the PS national bureau. With 6.19% of the vote, the PS recorded its lowest score in history. Although the 2019 European elections were a failure, the 2020 municipal elections saw the party maintain its local presence, notably thanks to its alliances with EELV and the French Communist Party.

On 27 August, Olivier Faure announced the organization of an internal primary to select the party's candidate for the 2022 French presidential election. Following the announcement of Anne Hidalgo's candidacy on 12 September, Le Monde reported that this vote have "formality" as the mayor of Paris is supported by Olivier Faure, first secretary of the Socialist Party (PS), whose policy document for re-election as PS leader, which supports her, came out on top a few days earlier. While she confirmed that she was not in favour of a left-wing alliance until the morning of the 8 December 2021, ('a union of the left would not work because it would be "perceived as artificial'"), Anne Hidalgo proposed the organisation of a left primary on TF1's 8pm news that same day.

== Candidates for the nomination ==
Candidate (name and age)	Party	Main political function(s) during the campaign	Comments	Place
Anne Hidalgo (62)	PS	Mayor of Paris (since 2014) Vice-President of the métropole du Grand Paris (since 2016)	She announced her candidacy on 12 September 2021.	1st
Stéphane Le Foll (61)	PS	Mayor of Mans (since 2018) President of Mans Métropole (since 2018)	A former Minister of Agriculture, former government spokesperson, and close associate of François Hollande, he announced his candidacy for the primary in July 2021.	2nd

== Potential candidates who have withdrawn ==
- Ségolène Royal, former minister and member of parliament, Socialist Party candidate in the 2007 French presidential election.
- Bernard Cazeneuve, Prime Minister of France from 2016 to 2017.
- Jean-Christophe Cambadélis, former first secretary of the PS.

== Results ==
Results
Candidates	Party	Votes	%
Anne Hidalgo	PS	15,208	72.6
Stéphane Le Foll	PS	5,741	27.4
Valid votes		20,949	94.58
Blank votes		1,045	4.72
Invalid votes		156	0.7
Total		22,150	100

== See also ==
- 2022 French presidential election
- Socialist Party (France)
