= Domadice =

Village and municipality in Slovakia

Domadice Dalmad
- Municipality
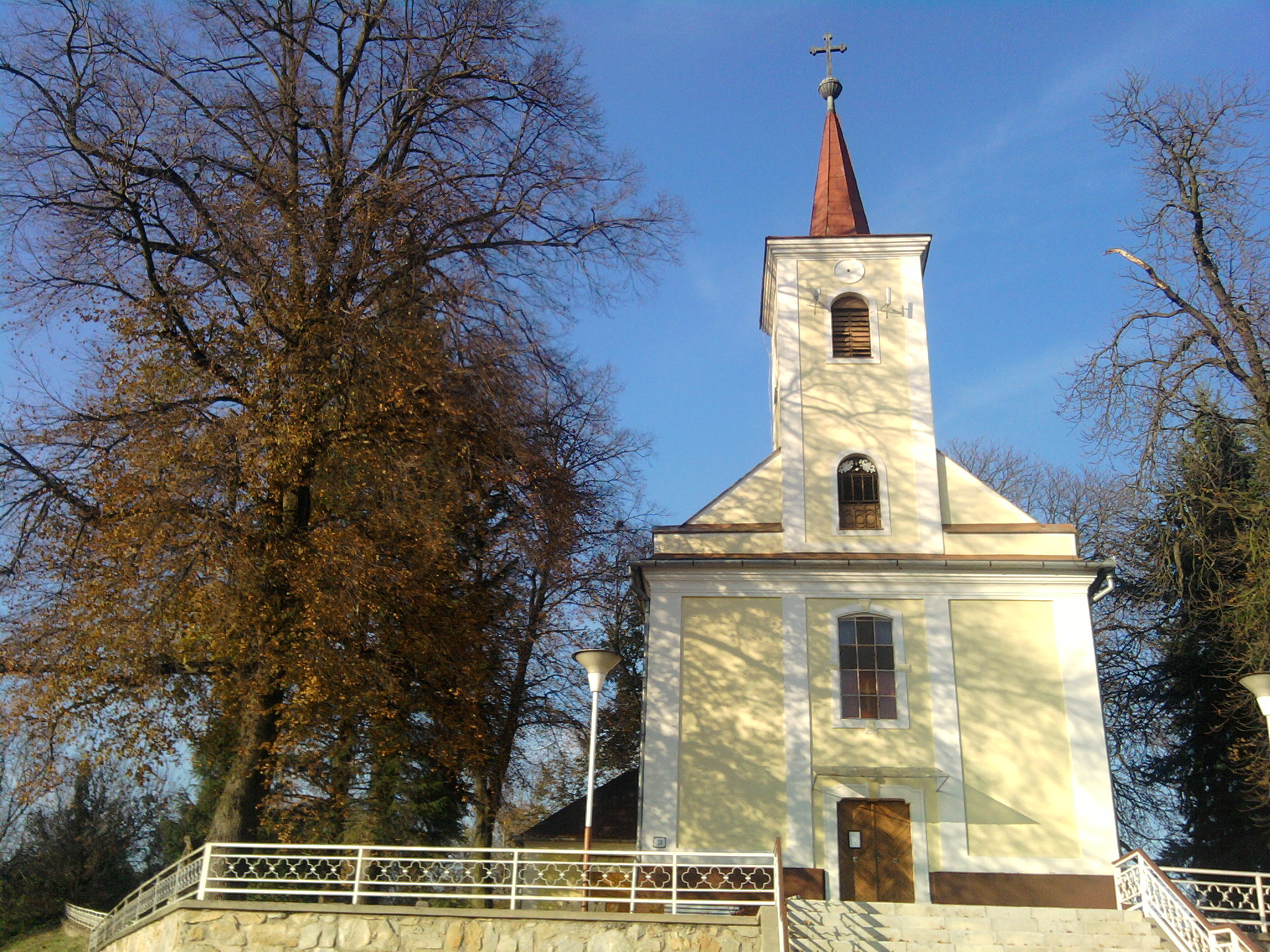

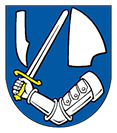
- Flag Coat of arms

- Location of Domadice in the Nitra Region Location of Domadice in Slovakia
- Coordinates: 48.18°N 18.78°E
- Country: Slovakia
- Region: Nitra Region
- District: Levice District
- First mentioned: 1138

Government
  - Mayor: Antónia Foltánová (HLAS–SD)

Area
  - Total: 13.61 km^{2} (5.25 sq mi)
- Elevation: 161 m (528 ft)

Population (2025)
  - Total: 229
- Time zone: UTC+1 (CET)
  - Summer (DST): UTC+2 (CEST)
- Postal code: 935 87
- Area code: +421 36
- Vehicle registration plate (until 2022): LV
- Website: www.domadice.sk

Domadice (Hungarian: Dalmad) is a village and municipality in the Levice District in the Nitra Region of Slovakia.

== History ==
In historical records the village was first mentioned in 1138. The village belonged to the noble family Dalmady de Dalmad. According to the Urbarium of 1767 many other noble families lived here. These would be included: Halácsy, Bottlik, Pomothy, Bodonyi, Dalmady, Sántha, Sembery, Lehoczky and Szabadhegyi.

== Geography ==
The municipality lies at an altitude of 161 metres (528 ft) and covers an area of 13.61 km^{2} (5.25 sq mi) (2025).

== Population ==
Population statistic (10 years)
Year	1995	2005	2015	2025
Count	304	231	252	229
Difference		−24.01%	+9.09%	−9.12%

Population statistic
Year	2024	2025
Count	236	229
Difference		−2.96%

It has a population of 229 people (31 December 2025).

=== Ethnicity ===
Census 2021 (1+ %)
Ethnicity	Number	Fraction
Slovak	223	92.14%
Not found out	16	6.61%
Hungarian	3	1.23%
Total	242	

In year 2021 was 242 people by ethnicity 223 as Slovak, 16 as Not found out, 3 as Hungarian, 1 as Ukrainian and 1 as Romani.

Note on population: The difference values of population numbers in the table "Population statistic" and in the sections "Ethnicity" & "Religion" is caused by the use of various statistical methods.

=== Religion ===
Census 2021 (1+ %)
Religion	Number	Fraction
Roman Catholic Church	177	73.14%
None	29	11.98%
Not found out	15	6.2%
Evangelical Church	14	5.79%
Total	242	

In year 2021 was 242 people by religion 177 from Roman Catholic Church, 29 from None, 15 from Not found out, 14 from Evangelical Church, 2 from Eastern Orthodox Church, 1 from Calvinist Church, 1 from Paganism and natural spirituality, 1 from Jehovah's Witnesses, 1 from Christian Congregations in Slovakia and 1 from Apostolic Church.

== Facilities ==
The village has a public library and a football pitch.

== Genealogical resources ==
The records for genealogical research are available at the state archive "Statny Archiv in Nitra, Slovakia"

- Roman Catholic church records (births/marriages/deaths): 1693-1895 (parish B)
- Lutheran church records (births/marriages/deaths): 1746-1896 (parish B)
- Reformated church records (births/marriages/deaths): 1753-1897 (parish B)

== See also ==
- List of municipalities and towns in Slovakia
