= Krškany =

Village and municipality in Slovakia

Krškany Kereskény
- Municipality
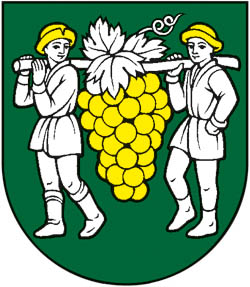
- Flag Coat of arms

- Location of Krškany in the Nitra Region Location of Krškany in Slovakia
- Coordinates: 48.22°N 18.67°E
- Country: Slovakia
- Region: Nitra Region
- District: Levice District
- First mentioned: 1242

Government
  - Mayor: Gabriela Agárdyová

Area
  - Total: 17.02 km^{2} (6.57 sq mi)
- Elevation: 164 m (538 ft)

Population (2025)
  - Total: 837
- Time zone: UTC+1 (CET)
  - Summer (DST): UTC+2 (CEST)
- Postal code: 935 01
- Area code: +421 36
- Vehicle registration plate (until 2022): LV
- Website: www.krskany.sk

Krškany (Hungarian: Kereskény) is a village and municipality in the Levice District in the Nitra Region of Slovakia.

== History ==
In historical records the village was first mentioned in 1242. According to the Urbarium of 1767 these noble families lived here: Disznóssy, Agardy, Horváthy, Pomothy, Zmeskál, Paulik and Krsák.

== Geography ==
The municipality lies at an altitude of 164 metres (538 ft) and covers an area of 17.02 km^{2} (6.57 sq mi) (2025).

== Population ==
Population statistic (10 years)
Year	1995	2005	2015	2025
Count	753	732	762	837
Difference		−2.78%	+4.09%	+9.84%

Population statistic
Year	2024	2025
Count	830	837
Difference		+0.84%

It has a population of 837 people (31 December 2025).

=== Ethnicity ===
Census 2021 (1+ %)
Ethnicity	Number	Fraction
Slovak	751	94.94%
Not found out	28	3.53%
Hungarian	13	1.64%
Total	791	

In year 2021 was 791 people by ethnicity 751 as Slovak, 28 as Not found out, 13 as Hungarian, 4 as Czech, 2 as English, 1 as Italian, 1 as Serbian, 1 as Rusyn and 1 as Polish.

Note on population: The difference values of population numbers in the table "Population statistic" and in the sections "Ethnicity" & "Religion" is caused by the use of various statistical methods.

=== Religion ===
Census 2021 (1+ %)
Religion	Number	Fraction
Roman Catholic Church	510	64.48%
None	130	16.43%
Not found out	99	12.52%
Evangelical Church	43	5.44%
Total	791	

In year 2021 was 791 people by religion 510 from Roman Catholic Church, 130 from None, 99 from Not found out, 43 from Evangelical Church, 4 from Greek Catholic Church, 2 from Calvinist Church, 1 from Old Catholic Church, 1 from Eastern Orthodox Church and 1 from Jehovah's Witnesses.

== Facilities ==
The village has a public library and a soccer pitch.
