= Boria =

Boria may refer to:

== People ==
- Juan Boria (1906–1995), Puerto Rican poet
- Boria Sax (born 1949), American author and teacher
- Boria (footballer) (born 1962), Spanish footballer

== Places ==
- Boria, Poland
- Boria Bal, a village in Afghanistan
- Boria, a village in Jam Kandorana, Gujarat, India

== Other uses ==
- Boria (caste), a Hindu caste found in North India
- Boria (theatre), a form of ethnic Malay theatre from Penang
- Boron trioxide

== See also ==
- Borias
- Bori (disambiguation)
- Borija (disambiguation)
