= Pomothy =

Hungarian noble family

Coat of arms of Pomothy family

The Pomothy family is the name of an old Hungarian noble family which originates in the Hont County. Members of the family were also styled Pomothy de Horhi és Unatényi.

== History ==
The first mentioned member of the family is Peter Pomoti in 1339. The family flourished through the centuries owning large estates in Horhy and Unatin.

In 1520 Ferencz Pomothy married Elisabeth Deméndi de Theszéri. Elisabeth was one of the last living members of the famous Deméndi family, which owned huge estates in Demandice and Sadzice. Through this marriage the Pomothy family rose to prominence and inherited large estates.

Around 1600 Mihaly Pomothy chose to change his name to Almassy. Mihaly was also a member of the Hont County magistrate. His line died out, leaving only a daughter which married into the Keszy de Keőkeszi family.

During the 18th and 19th century members of this noble family mostly managed their estates. The family is related to: Keviczky, Sirchich, Bory, Udvardy, Batisz, Johannides, Bende, Sarnoczay, Domaniky, Litassy, Dalmady, Kalnay and Ürmenyi.

== Protestant branch of Stephanus Pomothy ==
Stephanus Pomothy de Horhi et Unatényi (1730 – 1805) Protestant aristocrat and owner of the Horša estate. His wife was a Maria Prandorffy de Prandorf (1750 – 1807)

- Paulus (1769 - 1811), his wife was Susana Batisz de Kiscsepcsényi
  - Paulus (1796)
  - Joannes (1798 - 1855), his first wife was Anna Szaszky, the widow of Michael Sarnóczay de Sarnó, his second wife was Susana Johannides from the Komárno noble family Johannides.
    - Joannes (1835), his wife was Susana Fabry (1842 - 1905) they lived in Budapest
      - Joannes (1867), his wife was Elisabeth Balla (1871)
      - Paulina (1870 - 1933), her husband was Stephanus Gyekinszky
      - Julianna (1872)
      - Peter (1874)
      - Susana (1875)
      - Susana (1878)
      - Rudolf (1881 - 1941), his wife was Matilda Ratulovszky. He was a doktor at the University of Budapest
    - Maria (1838)
    - Peter (1842)
    - Elisabeth (1846)
  - Susana (1803)
- Maria (1769)
- Gabriel (1781)
- Ladislaus (1781), his wife was Catherina Morvay
  - Adamus (1813)
  - Joannes (1809)
  - Judith (1817)
- Anna (1772), her husband was Stephanus Sarnóczay de Sarnó and her second husband was Davidom Pomothy de Horhi et Unatényi from the Calvinist branch of the Pomothy family
- Susana (1775)
- Anna (1777)
- Gregorius (1780)
- Anna (1792)

== Branch of David Pomothy and Anna Pomothy ==
David Pomothy de Horhi et Unatényi (1787–1850) Calvinist landowner in Bory. His wife was Anna Pomothy from the Protestant branch and a widow of Stephanus Sarnóczay de Sarnó

- Carolina Josephina (1819–1820)
- Michael (1809–1888), his wife was Catharina Szalacsy de Szalacs
  - Etel (1838), her husband was Elias Johannes Huszthy de Ruzinyai (1826–1865)
  - Gyula (1839)
  - Ilona (1841–1912), her husband was Josephus Csesznok (1834–1905)
- Josephus Gabriel (1813–1895), his wife was Rosalia Catharina Petrovics de Vágujhelyi és Galgóczi (1826–1911)
  - Gabriella (1860–1909), her husband was Dr. Kalman Halasy
    - Valeria Halasy (1893)
    - Maria Karlotta Rozina Halasy (1891)
    - Olga Halasy (1892)
  - Kalman (1883–1920), his wife was Etel Nagy
