= Bory de Bori és Borfői =

Hungarian noble family

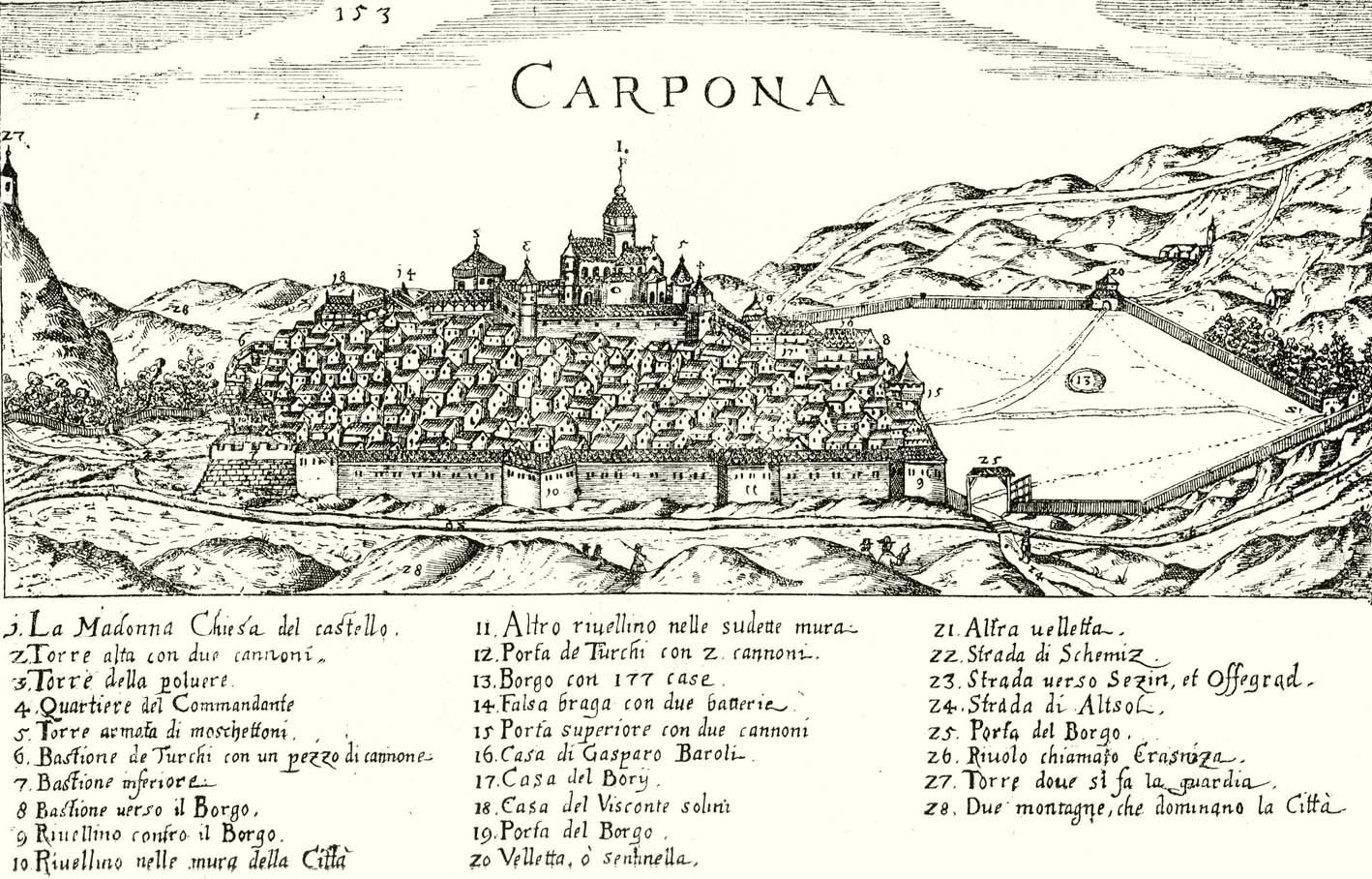
Krupina in 16th century

Bory de Bori és Borfői was an ancient Hungarian noble family with a lineage dating back to 1275. The family's prominence and recognition can be attributed to their valiant contributions in warfare against King Ottokar II of Bohemia during the reign of Ladislaus IV of Hungary. In recognition of their heroic efforts, Ladislaus IV elevated the family's status and granted them land in what is now modern-day Slovakia, which came to be known as Bory.

== History ==
During the early 16th century, numerous members of the Bory family fought alongside the Austrian Imperial army in conflicts against the Ottoman Empire. In particular, Mihaly Bory successfully defended the castles of Nógrád and Drégely against Ottoman forces. However, in the Battle of Szikszó on October 8, 1588, Paul Bory lost his life

In 1665, Emperor Leopold I appointed another Mihaly Bory as the Kaptain of Krupina (Karpfen in German, Korpona in Hungarian). This Mihaly Bory enjoyed a close friendship and alliance with Count Ferenc Wesselényi de Hadad et Murány. As a result, Count Ferenc Wesselényi appointed him as an ambassador to Archbishop-Elector of Mainz, Johann Philipp von Schönborn. Mihaly's son, Gabor, defended the Léva Castle during the Rákóczi Uprising.

Throughout the 18th and 19th centuries, members of the Bory family formed marital alliances with various noble families, both renowned and lesser-known. These families included Csiffary, Osztroluczky, Dúló, Palásthy, Akács, Pomothy, Dalmady, Kalnay, Madách, Baron Lipthay, Baron Hellenbach, Baron Vecsey, Gosztonyi, Sembery, and Count Balassa.

== Members ==
- Mihaly Bory de Bori és Borfői (cca. 1650) Kaptain of Krupina, ambassador to Archbishop-Elector of Mainz Johann Philipp von Schönborn and friend of Count Ferenc Wesselenyi.
- Joannes Bory de Bori és Borfői (1740–1807) Hont County Court Judge.
- Nicolaus Bory de Bori és Borfői (1783–1829) Hungarian royal court counselor, husband of Baroness Carolina Hellenbach de Paczolay. She was a member of the Sternkreuzorden.
- Michael Bory de Bori és Borfői (1825 - cca. 1900) administrative officer in Demandice.
- Jenő Bory de Bori és Borfői (1879–1959) famous constructor of the Bory Castle.
