= Henri Lefèvre d'Ormesson =

French politician

3rd Mayor of Paris
- In office 21 November 1792 – Resigned in 1792
- Preceded by: René Boucher
- Succeeded by: Nicolas Chambon

Personal details
- Born: 8 May 1751 Paris, France
- Died: 12 April 1808 (aged 56) Paris, France
- Occupation: politician

Henri Lefèvre d'Ormesson (8 May 1751, Paris, France – 12 April 1808, Paris, France) was a French politician. In 1783, he very briefly served as Finance Minister at a critical moment when France was on the verge of acknowledging its bankruptcy. He was only thirty-one years old at the time. When he brought his concerns to the king he was reproached: Louis said to d'Ormesson, "I am still younger, and my situation is more difficult than that which I intrust to you." This gave the new finance minister a boost in confidence, but he was unable to rise to the enormous challenge of stabilizing the nation's financial turmoil, and, after holding office for only seven months, he resigned in late 1783. A man of inconsiderable fortune, he nevertheless donated to the poor of St.-Cyr. He served as Mayor of Paris starting on 21 November 1792, but resigned immediately. He was replaced by Nicolas Chambon on 30 November 1792.
