= Borija =

Borija may refer to:

- Borija, Kalinovik, populated place in Bosnia and Herzegovina
- Borija (musical instrument), an early Bosnian type of trumpet

== See also ==
- Boria (disambiguation)
