= Bruno Julliard =

French politician (born 1981)

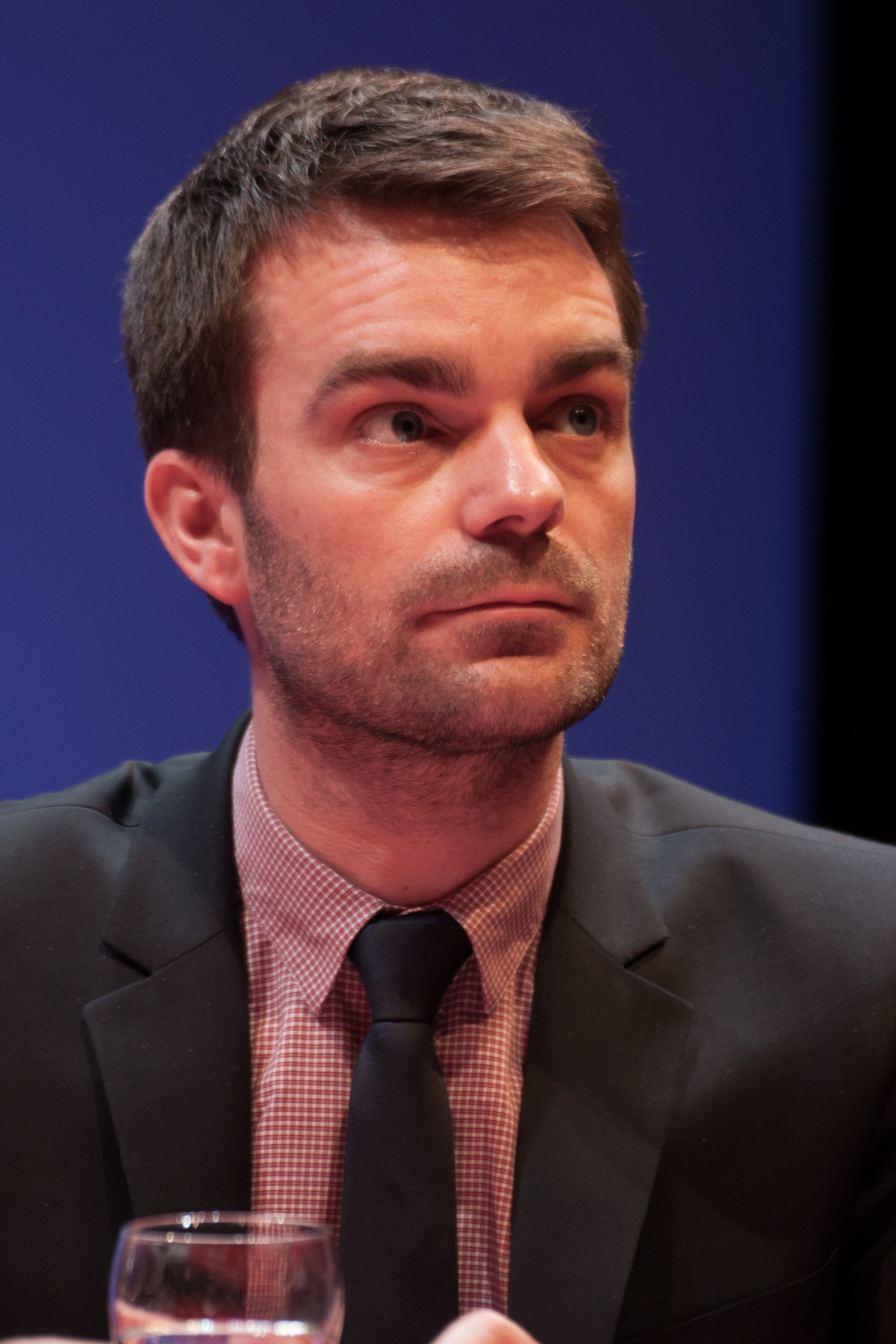
- Bruno Julliard in 2013

First Deputy Mayor of Paris
- In office 5 April 2014 – 17 September 2018
- Mayor: Anne Hidalgo
- Preceded by: Anne Hidalgo
- Succeeded by: Emmanuel Grégoire

Personal details
- Born: 9 February 1981 (age 45) Le Puy-en-Velay, Haute-Loire, France
- Party: Socialist Party
- Spouse: Paul-Valère Le Goff (m. 2017)
- Education: Lumière University Lyon 2

Bruno Julliard (born 9 February 1981) is a former student leader and politician of the Socialist Party (PS) who served as chairman of the UNEF, the main student union in France. More recently, he was the First Deputy Mayor of Paris between 2014 and 2018.

== Early life and activism ==
Julliard was born in Le-Puy-en-Velay, Haute-Loire, Auvergne, where his mother, Arlette Arnaud-Landau, is now a Socialist mayor. His stepfather is a Socialist militant, and his grandfather was in the French Resistance during World War II, during which he was shot.

Julliard studied public law at the University of Lyon, where he joined UNEF in 1999. He became the student vice-president of the University of Lyon and chairman of the university's student union in 2001. In 2003, he entered the UNEF National Board. From 2004 to 2006, he served on the National Council for Higher Education and Research (CNESER), an advisory body to the Ministry of Education.

From July 2005, Julliard was the leader of the Majorité Nationale fraction and, therefore, chairman of the UNEF. He was among the protesting student leaders during the enormous social movement of 2005 against the CPE law and led negotiations with minister Valérie Pécresse.

== Political career ==
Before being elected chairman of the UNEF, Julliard was a local branch leader of the French Young Socialist Movement (Mouvement des Jeunes Socialistes) and Socialist Party. During the party's campaign for the 2007 presidential election, however, he publicly criticised candidate Ségolène Royal for her positions on youth policy.

In the 2008 municipal election, Julliard became a member of the Council of Paris and subsequently joined the team of mayor Bertrand Delanoë. In addition to his role in city politics, he was part of François Hollande's campaign team for the 2012 presidential election. From 2012 until 2013, he worked for Minister of Education Vincent Peillon.

From 2013, Julliard served − alongside Myriam El Khomri – as spokesperson for the campaign of Anne Hidalgo, the Socialist Party's candidate for mayor of Paris in the 2014 elections. Following Hidalgo's victory, he was appointed First Deputy Mayor of Paris, responsible for cultural affairs. During his time in office, he oversaw efforts at the Louvre and Orsay museums in 2016 to move artworks to safety as the rain-swollen river Seine hit its highest level in 30 years.

Ahead of the Socialist Party's 2017 primaries, Julliard joined Hidalgo in publicly endorsing Peillon as the party's candidate for that year's French presidential election.

== Life after politics ==
In 2020, Julliard was recruited by entrepreneur and philanthropist Frédéric Jousset as director of Art Explora, a newly established non-profit foundation.

== Personal life ==
Julliard has been married to Paul-Valère Le Goff since 2017.
