= Giulano Ruffini =

French art collector

Giulano Ruffini (born 1945) is a French art collector who has discovered a number of paintings that have been authenticated as being by old masters but some of which are suspected to be forgeries.

Investigation started in 2014.

Painter Lino Frongia is suspected as author.

Aude Buresi issued two arrest warrants in 2019 calling for the extradition of Frongia and Ruffini from Italy to France, but in 2020 Italian appeals court dismissed all nine of Buresi’s accusations against Frongia. In 2021 Ruffini was under an investigation by Italian fiscal authorities about 2013 - 2017 taxes. In 2022 Ruffini and his son Mathieu Ruffini were justified in Italy on charges of tax evasion.

== Works ==
Ruffini said that he was lucky enough to find paintings that could have been done by Jan or Pieter Brueghel, Van Dyck, Correggio, Bronzino, Parmigianino, Solario, Van Bassen, Grimmer, Coorte and others.

Among involved paintings:

- Orazio Gentileschi. "David Contemplating the Head of Goliath"
- Portrait of Cardinal Borgia after Velazquez
- Correggio (school of). "Head of Christ"
- El Greco. "San Francesco"
- Frans Hals. "Portrait of a Gentleman" (Sotheby's, 2011)
- Cranach. "Venus with a Veil" (Prince of Liechtenstein's collection)
- Parmigianino. "Saint Jerome". (Sotheby’s, 2012)
- Bronzino. "Saint Cosmos"

== See also ==
- André Borie
