= Philibert Borie =

French physician and Mayor of Paris

3rd Mayor of Paris
- In office 7 July 1792 – 13 July 1792
- Preceded by: Jérôme Pétion de Villeneuve
- Succeeded by: René Boucher (temporary mayor)

Personal details
- Born: c. 1759 France
- Died: 1832 (aged 73) France
- Occupation: physician, politician

Philibert Borie (c. 1759–1832) was a French physician and Mayor of Paris for six days in July 1792.
