= Nicolas Chambon =

French politician

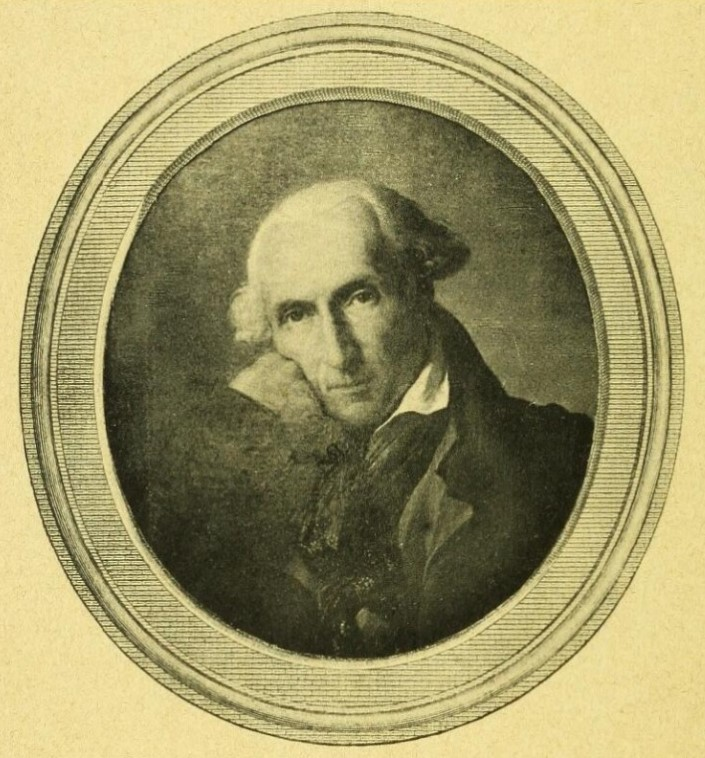

4th Mayor of Paris
- In office 1 December 1792 – 4 February 1793
- Preceded by: Henri Lefèvre d'Ormesson
- Succeeded by: Jean-Nicolas Pache

Personal details
- Born: 21 September 1748 Limeil-Brévannes, (Val-de-Marne), France
- Died: 2 November 1826 (aged 78) Paris, France
- Party: Girondist
- Occupation: politician

Nicolas Chambon (21 September 1748, Limeil-Brévannes, (Val-de-Marne), France - 2 November 1826, Paris, France) was a French politician who served as Mayor of Paris from 1792 to 1793.
