= Jean-Baptiste Fleuriot-Lescot =

Belgian architect, sculptor, and revolutionary politician

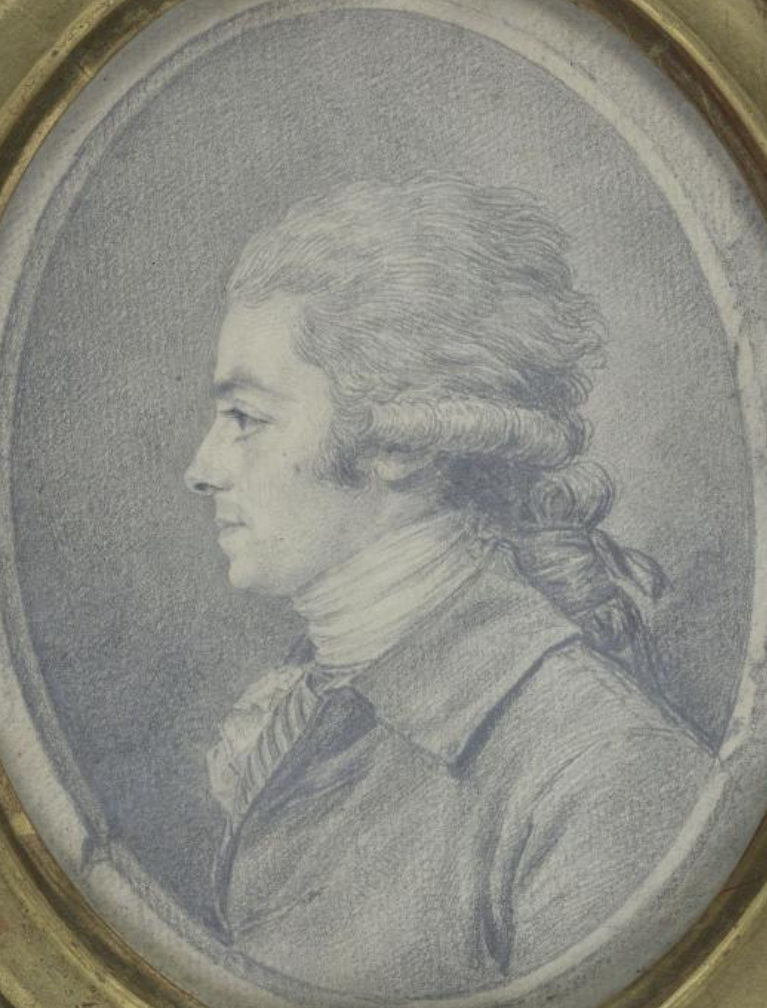
- Portrait of Fleuriot-Lescot, c. 1790. Musée Carnavalet, Paris.

Mayor of Paris
- In office 10 May 1794 – 27 July 1794
- Preceded by: Jean-Nicolas Pache
- Succeeded by: Office abolished (No mayor until Louis-Antoine Garnier-Pagès in 1848)

Personal details
- Born: 1761 Brussels, Austrian Netherlands
- Died: 28 July 1794 (aged 32–33) Paris, France
- Resting place: Catacombs of Paris, formerly at the Cimetière des Errancis
- Occupation: Architect, sculptor, revolutionary politician

Jean-Baptiste Edmond Fleuriot-Lescot (1761 – 28 July 1794), also known as Lescot-Fleuriot, was an architect, sculptor, and revolutionary politician from the Austrian Netherlands. He briefly served as Mayor of Paris in 1794 during the most radical phase of the French Revolution, and was executed by guillotine alongside Maximilien Robespierre and his allies on 9 Thermidor Year II.

== Biography ==
=== Early life and career ===
Fleuriot-Lescot was born in Brussels in 1761, the son of Nicolas Fleuriot-Lescot, an officer of the University of Paris, and Erneste Ebherlinck. He worked as an architect and sculptor, and served the Duke of La Rochefoucauld-Liancourt, directing peat operations in Liancourt (Oise) from 1785. He later settled in Paris, where he married Françoise Madeleine Belloir-Dutally in 1788.

In 1789, he participated in the Brabant Revolution against the reforms of Emperor Joseph II, before taking refuge in France.

=== Revolutionary activity ===
Once in Paris, Fleuriot-Lescot became active in revolutionary politics. He joined the radical Jacobins and allied himself with Maximilien Robespierre. He was appointed commissioner of public works and worked under architect Bernard Poyet for the revolutionary Commune of Paris.

A staunch supporter of the sans-culottes, he participated in key demonstrations, including the Champ de Mars and the Insurrection of 10 August 1792. In March 1793, he was appointed substitute to the public prosecutor of the Revolutionary Tribunal, Antoine Quentin Fouquier-Tinville.

=== Mayor of Paris ===
On 10 May 1794 (21 Floréal Year II), Fleuriot-Lescot was appointed Mayor of Paris, replacing Jean-Nicolas Pache, who had lost favor due to his association with the Hébertists. He served for just over two months.

=== 9 Thermidor and execution ===
During the coup of 9 Thermidor (27 July 1794), Fleuriot-Lescot convened the Commune in emergency session alongside François Hanriot and Claude-François de Payan. They issued a proclamation urging Parisians to rise in defense of "their true friends."

The uprising collapsed quickly. That evening, the National Convention declared the mayor and the Commune's leadership outlaws. At 2 a.m. on 10 Thermidor, Fleuriot-Lescot was arrested with other officials at the Hôtel de Ville by forces loyal to the Convention under Léonard Bourdon.

He was tried the same day by the Revolutionary Tribunal, where Gilbert Lieudon prosecuted in place of Fouquier-Tinville, who recused himself due to personal ties. Fleuriot-Lescot was sentenced to death and executed with Robespierre, Louis Antoine de Saint-Just, Georges Couthon, and others.

== Publications ==
- Réflexions générales sur le système employé par les intrigants, depuis 1789, pour entraver la marche de la liberté et sur les moyens de la faire triompher de tous ses ennemis (1792)
