= Anne Hidalgo =

French politician (born 1959)

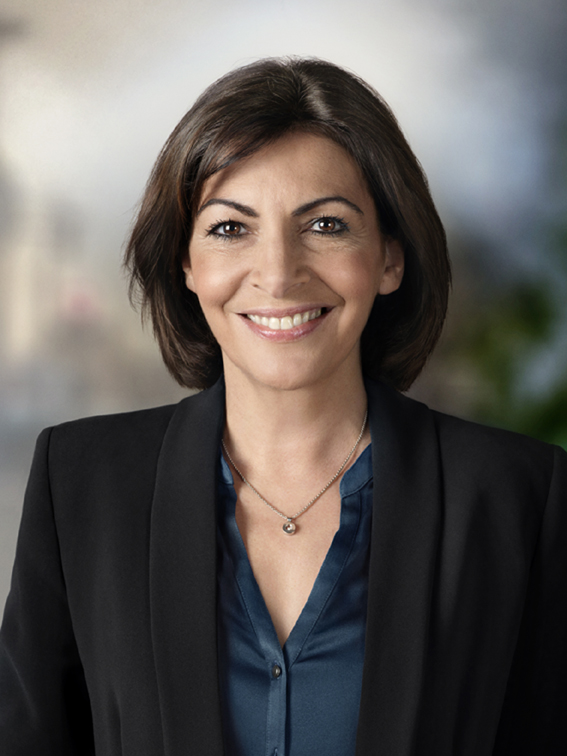
- Official portrait, 2014

Mayor of Paris
- In office 5 April 2014 – 29 March 2026
- Deputy: Bruno Julliard; Emmanuel Grégoire; Patrick Bloche
- Preceded by: Bertrand Delanoë
- Succeeded by: Emmanuel Grégoire

First Deputy Mayor of Paris
- In office 18 March 2001 – 5 April 2014
- Mayor: Bertrand Delanoë
- Preceded by: Jacques Dominati
- Succeeded by: Bruno Julliard

Councillor of Paris
- In office 9 March 2001 – 22 March 2026
- Constituency: 15th arrondissement (2001–2020); 11th arrondissement (2020–2026)

Member of the Regional Council of Île-de-France
- In office 2 April 2004 – 10 April 2014
- President: Jean-Paul Huchon
- Constituency: Paris

Personal details
- Born: Ana María Hidalgo Aleu; 19 June 1959 (age 67) San Fernando, Andalusia, Spain
- Citizenship: France; Spain
- Party: Socialist Party
- Spouses: Philippe Jantet (divorced) Jean-Marc Germain (m. 2004)
- Children: 3
- Education: Jean Moulin University Lyon 3 Paris Nanterre University

Ana María "Anne" Hidalgo Aleu (French: [an idalɡo]; Spanish: [iˈðalɣo]; born 19 June 1959) is a Spanish-born French politician who served as the Mayor of Paris from 2014 to 2026 and is the first woman to hold the office. She is a member of the Socialist Party (PS).

Hidalgo was First Deputy Mayor of Paris under Mayor Bertrand Delanoë (2001–2014), having held the title of Councillor of Paris from 2001. She was elected mayor in 2014 after Delanoë declined to seek a third term. During her first mayoral term, Hidalgo launched the city-wide Réinventer Paris ("Reinvent Paris") programme, which aimed at refurbish and provide new uses for obsolescent sites and to open a participatory budgeting platform for projects throughout Paris. 2015 was marked by instances of Islamic terrorism: the January Charlie Hebdo shooting and November coordinated attacks, including the Bataclan theatre massacre, the aftermath of which Hidalgo witnessed firsthand.

Her popularity declined after several instances of alleged mismanagement, to the point that polls showed a majority of voters did not want her to win a second term in 2020. First Deputy Mayor Bruno Julliard resigned in 2018, criticising Hidalgo's style of governance. In 2019 she oversaw the disaster recovery efforts for the Notre-Dame de Paris fire. While the COVID-19 pandemic led to a record low voter turnout, she was reelected with a plurality of the vote.

During her second term, Hidalgo oversaw Paris's response to the pandemic, implementing measures such as nightly curfews, closure of non-essential shops and the introduction of 50 kilometres (31 mi) of pop-up cycle lanes known as "coronapistes" to ease pressure on public transport. By early 2021, some of Hidalgo's policies had gained international attention, such as her proposal to remove over half of Paris's car parking spaces and turn the Champs-Élysées into a "fantastic garden". In 2024, Paris hosted the Summer Olympics; the opening ceremony was held outside of a stadium for the first time in modern history, with the athletes paraded by boat along the Seine.

On 12 September 2021, Hidalgo announced her candidacy in the Socialist primary for the 2022 presidential election, despite her 2020 pledge to serve a full second term as mayor. She came tenth out of twelve candidates, with 1.75% of the vote, the lowest result ever for a Socialist candidate in a French presidential election.

== Early life and education ==
=== Family background and youth ===
Hidalgo was born in San Fernando, province of Cádiz, Spain. Her paternal grandfather was a Spanish Socialist who became a refugee in France after the end of the Spanish Civil War along with his wife and his four children. However, her grandparents returned to Spain some time later. Her grandmother died on the return trip, whereas her grandfather was sentenced to death, although this sentence was eventually commuted to life imprisonment.

Hidalgo's father, Antonio Hidalgo (born in Antequera), was raised by his maternal grandparents. He was an electrician. In the late 1950s, he married a seamstress named Maria; they had two daughters, Ana (Anne) and María (Marie). Due to Spain's social and economic problems resulting from the Stabilization Plan, Hidalgo's parents migrated to France in 1961, this time as economic immigrants. They settled in Lyon with their two daughters.

Hidalgo grew up in Vaise, the 9th arrondissement of Lyon, speaking Spanish with her parents and French with her sister. Her parents are now back in Spain and her sister manages a company in Los Angeles. Hidalgo and her parents were naturalised French when she was 14. In 2003, she regained Spanish nationality and since then has had dual French–Spanish citizenship.

=== Studies ===
Hidalgo graduated with a master's degree in social law at Jean Moulin University Lyon 3 before completing a Master of Advanced Studies (DEA) in social and trade unionism at Paris West University Nanterre La Défense.

== Labour inspector ==
In 1982, Hidalgo entered the national contest for the Inspection du travail (Labour Inspectorate), ranking fifth. She obtained her first inspector assignment in Chevilly-Larue in 1984 at the age of 24, before receiving a post in the 15th arrondissement of Paris where she lived, a few months later.

In 1991, Hidalgo was appointed director of the National Institute of Labour. In 1993, she joined the vocational training delegation at the Ministry of Labour and then obtained a mission at the International Labour Office in Geneva from 1995 to 1996. She then worked for one year as a project manager for the Director of Human Resources at the Ministry of Labour. From 1996 to 1997, she was an officer at the Human Resources Directorate of Compagnie Générale des Eaux (then Vivendi and Vivendi Universal).

Hidalgo retired from the civil service on 1 July 2011, aged 52.

== Member of ministerial cabinets ==
Between 1997 and 2002, Hidalgo worked as a staffer in three ministerial offices within the government of Lionel Jospin: first in the office of Martine Aubry at the Ministry of Employment and Solidarity as technical advisor; then with Nicole Péry, Secretary of State for Women's Rights and Vocational Training, from 1998 to 2000, as technical advisor then consultant to the firm, participating, in particular, in the drafting of laws on parity and professional equality between women and men; and from November 2000 to May 2002, as a technical adviser and then mission manager, responsible for social relations and the status of civil servants, in the office of Marylise Lebranchu, Minister of Justice.

Hidalgo said on 4 April 2013, on RMC: "I earn 5,000 euros net per month for my mandates". According to the website Atlantico, she received, for all her revenues, around 8,200 euros net per month.

== Political career ==
In the 2001 municipal elections, she led the list of the Socialist Party (PS) in the 15th arrondissement of Paris, which won 26.5% of votes in the first round; at the second round it then placed behind the list gathered around Édouard Balladur and Mayor René Galy-Dejean. She joined the Council of Paris and was appointed First Deputy Mayor of Paris.

In June 2002, she was a candidate in the legislative election in the 12th arrondissement of Paris, winning 29.6% of votes in the first round, but Balladur was elected with 54.2% of the vote. In March 2004, she was elected to the Regional Council of Île-de-France on the list led by Jean-Paul Huchon.

As part of the internal campaign for the nomination of the Socialist candidate in 2006, she publicly supported Dominique Strauss-Kahn, while remaining close to Lionel Jospin and Bertrand Delanoë. With other female leaders of the Socialist Party, she criticized the "peoplelisation" of politics, referring to the promotion of Ségolène Royal as a popularist widely-identifiable member of the Socialist Party, rather than a classical Marxist.

In June 2007, she was a candidate at the legislative election in the 13th arrondissement of Paris and had in the first round 28.2%, against 36.6% for the UMP candidate Jean-François Lamour; she was beaten on the second round with 56.7% for Lamour.

=== First Deputy Mayor of Paris ===
In 2001, Hidalgo was elected councillor in the 15th arrondissement. She also joined the Council of Paris, where the left had a majority for the first time since 1977.

The new Mayor of Paris, Bertrand Delanoë, wishing to apply parity within his administration and among his deputies, appointed Hidalgo as the first deputy responsible for gender equality and the time office. Close to François Hollande, she thus obtained her first executive position. In 2002, she acted as Mayor of Paris during the convalescence of Delanoë after he was stabbed during an attempted assassination. She confided at the same time to consider a candidacy for Mayor of Toulouse in 2008.

In June 2002, as a candidate in the legislative election in Paris's 12th constituency, Hidalgo won 29.6% of the vote in the first and only round against 54.2% of the vote for incumbent Édouard Balladur, who was reelected. She also failed to take Paris's 13th constituency away from the UMP in June 2007, obtaining 28.2% of the vote in the first round, then 43.3% of the votes in the second round against 56.7% for the former Sports Minister Jean-François Lamour (UMP).

In the municipal elections of 9 and 16 March 2008, the assembly list (PS-PCF-PRG-MRC) that Hidalgo led in the 15th arrondissement of Paris came first in the first round with 35.9% of the vote (28 313 votes) against a strongly divided right, 33.9% to Philippe Goujon's UMP list and 10.1% to Gérard d'Aboville's list (various right). In the second round, her list obtained 47.35% of the votes against 52.65% obtained by Philippe Goujon, whose list merged with that of Gérard d'Aboville. Anne Hidalgo remained first Deputy Mayor under Bertrand Delanoë. She was then responsible for town planning and architecture and seats for the board of directors of the Parisian Urban Planning Workshop.

In 2017, an article from Capital stated that Hidalgo had been paid €100,000 by the Ministry of Labour from 2001 to 2003, while being Bertrand Delanoë's first deputy. Hidalgo's office indicated that she would file a complaint for defamation.

=== Regional councillor of Île-de-France ===
In the 2004 regional elections, Hidalgo was elected to the Regional Council of Île-de-France after being voted for Paris on the list conducted at the regional level by Jean-Paul Huchon. She became a member of the Committee on Transport and Traffic and is the Chair of the Regional AIDS Information and Prevention Centre (CRIPS).

In the 2010 regional elections, the Socialist list she led in Paris came in second place in the first round, with 26.3% of the vote, behind the list led by Chantal Jouanno (28.9%) and in front of the Green list of Robert Lion (20.6%). In the second round, his list took the lead with 57.9% of the votes cast, winning in the 1st and 5th districts, two bastions traditionally anchored on the right. Reelected as regional councillor, she joined the Committee on Culture and became president of Île-de-France Europe, which represents the region at the European Union institutions in Brussels. Jean-Luc Romero succeeded her to the presidency of the CRIPS. Upon her election as Mayor of Paris, she stepped down as a regional councillor.

=== Mayor of Paris ===
In 2012 Hidalgo announced her intention to succeed Delanoë in the 2014 Paris municipal election. The only candidate of her party after the withdrawal of Jean-Marie Le Guen, Hidalgo was appointed on 22 May 2013 to lead the municipal campaign, with 98.3% of the votes of 2,715 Paris Socialists. She appointed Pascal Cherki as her campaign spokesperson, assisted by Bruno Julliard, Rémi Féraud (also co-director of the campaign with Jean-Louis Missika), Ian Brossat (after the PS-PCF agreement), Colombe Brossel, Seybah Dagoma and Myriam El Khomri. On 10 October 2013, she was reelected as head of the PS list in the 15th arrondissement.

On 30 March 2014, in the second round, the list she led won a majority in the Paris Council. In the 15th arrondissement, her list was defeated by outgoing Mayor Philippe Goujon (UMP), whose list received 63.4% of the vote in the second round. For the first time, a candidate thus accessed the mayorship of Paris without being in the majority in their district. On 5 April 2014, she was elected mayor by the Paris Council, becoming the first woman to hold the position. Paris being also a department, she also became President of the Departmental Council of Paris, one of ten women (out of 101).

Hidalgo was elected First Vice President of the Métropole du Grand Paris on 22 January 2016, ex officio to her mayoral position.

Before the Socialist Party's 2017 primaries, Hidalgo endorsed Vincent Peillon for the presidential election later that year.

In 2017, United Nations Secretary General António Guterres appointed Hidalgo to the eight-member Independent Panel to Assess, Enhance Effectiveness of the United Nations Human Settlements Programme (UN-Habitat).

On 28 June 2020, Hidalgo was reelected mayor of Paris with 48.5% of the vote. There was a record low voter turnout in the second round of the municipal elections (64%), which were postponed because of the COVID-19 pandemic. Hidalgo's campaign focused on turning Paris into a 15-minute city (Ville du quart d'heure), aiming to make neighbourhoods more self-sufficient, with each arrondissement having its own grocery stores, parks, cafes, sports facilities, health centres, schools and offices accessible by a short walk or bike ride. In December 2020, Hidalgo was fined €90,000 (about $103,000) by the national government after she named 11 women out of 16 in her upper management, a violation of a French Civil Service Ministry rule allowing a maximum of 60% of one gender in leadership positions.

In 2021, Hidalgo's administration faced the Saccage Paris movement, which denounced on social media a degraded living environment in Paris, commenting on city cleanliness and urban planning.

In 2023, Hidalgo faced criticism of her trip to French Polynesia, which her political opponents called a "holiday". In response, she published a list of meetings she attended, and although she did not visit the 2024 Summer Olympics surfing site in Tahiti, she said her deputy in charge of sports did.

=== 2022 presidential election ===
In October 2021, Hidalgo won 72% of the vote in the 2021 Socialist primary for the 2022 French presidential election, ahead of the mayor of Le Mans, Stéphane Le Foll. At the start of 2022, she was one of seven names in the 2022 French People's Primary for a common left-wing candidate; she was one of three candidates who did not consent to be on its ballot. She came fifth out of seven candidates, the lowest of the five who were professional politicians. In the actual election, she came tenth of 12 candidates with 1.75% of the vote; she subsequently endorsed Emmanuel Macron over Marine Le Pen.

In 2024, Hidalgo announced that she would not seek a third term as Mayor of Paris, naming Rémi Féraud as her preferred successor.

== Political views ==
=== DADVSI ===
On 21 December 2005, in the debates on DADVSI (a French copyright reform bill), she took a public stand against the amendments of the Socialist Group introducing the "global licence" to download online material. On 26 December, she signed with Christophe Girard, Deputy Mayor of Paris responsible for Culture, a view published in the newspaper Le Monde defending her position on behalf of cultural diversity which would be threatened by the "global licence." Some people contend that she was in fact defending the interests of Vivendi Universal, the music and film company which employed her a few years earlier.

On 3 January 2006, she presented with François Adibi and the Socialist Party's Culture Section a report and new recommendations "for a fair solution", rejecting both the digital rights management (DRM) and the "global licence". She was later ostracised by the PS leadership which chose to defend in the National Assembly the "global licence" advocated by Patrick Bloche (Paris), Didier Mathus (Saône-et-Loire) and Christian Paul (Nièvre).

=== Anti-cult campaign ===
In 2005, Hidalgo took a stand in the debate on cults in France, becoming the president of a committee of vigilance against the cults at the Council of Paris. She was especially opposed to the Church of Scientology and New Acropolis, and participated in a demonstration in front of the Church of Scientology's premises. A map of cults in Paris, created by the Mairie de Paris at that time and promoted by Hidalgo, was controversial and Hidalgo filed a complaint against an unknown person for circulating a leaflet on the Internet signed by a "committee to support Anne Hidalgo", which requested denunciation of "non-compliant behaviours." Hidalgo denies any link with this supposed support committee. A complaint that she brought against the head of the organization that circulated the leaflet was later dismissed.

=== Environmental issues ===
In May 2016, to combat air pollution, Hidalgo oversaw the introduction of a scheme called "Paris Respire" (literally "Paris Breathes"), which included banning all cars from certain areas on the first Sunday of the month as well as making public transport and the city's bicycle and electric vehicle schemes free for the day. She also worked to reduce car usage by increasing the price of parking, banning free parking on certain days, and converting some sections of a highway along the Seine into a park. On 24 June 2017, she and President Emmanuel Macron called for the adoption of a Global Pact for the Environment along with other public figures such as Laurent Fabius, Nicolas Hulot, Arnold Schwarzenegger and Ban Ki-moon.

Hidalgo also proposed a ban on diesel motors in Paris streets and promised 24/7 service for the Paris Métro. She aimed to have more than 970 km (600 mi) of bike lanes in Paris by 2020.

In February 2020, Hidalgo launched her reelection campaign with a focus on making Paris a 15-minute city (ville du quart d'heure), a concept of urban proximity coined by Carlos Moreno. The phrase refers to the idea that residents of each neighbourhood should be able to reach all necessary amenities (such as schools, offices, shops, parks, health centres) by a 15-minute walk or bike ride, moving away from car dependency to cut air pollution levels.

In an October 2020 interview, Hidalgo said, "we must forget about crossing Paris from east to west by car". She announced her intention to create permanent curb-protected cycle lanes and expand the number of "coronapistes", cycle lanes created during the COVID-19 pandemic. She also said she intended to remove over half of Paris's parking spaces by the end of her term (70,000 out of 140,000).

In January 2021, Hidalgo announced that she had approved a €250 million renovation of the Champs-Élysées, with the intention of reducing space allocated to vehicles by half, turning roads into green and pedestrianised areas and planting tunnels of trees to improve air quality.

=== Housing ===
At the start of her first term, Hidalgo said in an interview that housing was her top priority. Under her mayorship, Paris produced 7,000 social housing units a year, up from 5,000 a year under her predecessor. She aimed for Paris to be 30% social housing by 2030.

=== Social media ===
In November 2023, Hidalgo publicly quit the social media platform X, calling it a "gigantic global sewer" that is "destroying our democracies" by spreading abuse and misinformation. Her move has been seen as a response to the perceived degradation of the platform since the acquisition of Twitter by Elon Musk but has also been linked to attacks on the platform resulting from the TahitiGate controversy.

=== Foreign issues ===
Hidalgo took part in the March for the Republic and Against Antisemitism in Paris on 12 November 2023 in response to the rise in antisemitism since the beginning of the Gaza war.

Hidalgo rejected calls to ban Israeli athletes from the Summer Olympics because of Israel's actions in the Gaza Strip, saying, "Sanctioning Israel in relation to the Olympic and Paralympic Games is out of the question because Israel is a democracy." She called for a ban on all Russian and Belarusian athletes from the Summer Olympics because of Russia's invasion of Ukraine.

In March 2024, Hidalgo announced that she would not attend the UN Climate Change Conference (COP29) in Baku, Azerbaijan, citing the Azerbaijani government's involvement in the ethnic cleansing of Armenians in the disputed Nagorno-Karabakh region in September 2023.

=== 2024 Olympics ===
Hidalgo was one of the main faces behind the organization of the 2024 Paris Olympics. In a bid to demonstrate that the Seine would be clean and safe for Olympic events, she told French radio on 10 July 2024 that she would swim in the river the next week. She fulfilled her promise on 17 July, swimming in the Seine in a wetsuit. Despite her promotional efforts, eleven days later Olympic organizers were forced to cancel a training session for triathletes due to high levels of fecal matter and E-coli bacteria in the river. The competition took place as scheduled, but several athletes later fell ill with gastrointestinal infections.

== Personal life ==
Since June 2004, Hidalgo has been married to politician Jean-Marc Germain, whom she met when they both worked in the office of Martine Aubry, then Minister of Labour. Hidalgo and Germain reside in the 15th arrondissement of Paris. They have a child together, Arthur Germain, who is the youngest Frenchman to swim the English Channel.

Hidalgo is also the mother of two children – Matthieu, born in 1986, a lawyer, and Elsa, born in 1988, an engineer – with her ex-husband Philippe Jantet.

Hidalgo had a Catholic education but is today an outspoken atheist.

== Other activities ==
- Paris Europlace, Member of the Board of Directors

== Recognition ==
=== Awards ===
- Medal of Andalusia (Spain, 2006)
- Yerevan Mayor Gold Medal (Armenia, 2016)
- Hidalgo was included in Time's 100 Most Influential People of 2020.

=== Honours ===
- Knight of the Legion of Honour (France, 2012)
- Officer of the National Order of Merit (France) (France, 2016)
- Gold Rays with Neck Ribbon of the Order of the Rising Sun (Japan, 2021)
- Plaque of the Order of the Aztec Eagle (Mexico, 2016)
- Grand Officer of the National Order of the Lion (Senegal, 2016)
- Dame Grand Cross of the Order of Civil Merit (Spain, 2015)
- Commander of the Order of Isabella the Catholic (Spain, 2010)
- Commander of the Order of the Polar Star (Sweden, 2014)
- Recipients of the Order of Princess Olga, 3rd class (Ukraine, 2026)

== Bibliography ==
- Une femme dans l'arène, published in June 2006, Le Rocher editions, co-written with Jean-Bernard Senon, preface by Bertrand Delanoë ISBN 2268059618
- Travail au bord de la crise de nerfs, published in October 2010, co-written with Jean-Bernard Senon ISBN 2081245221

Political offices
Preceded by Bertrand Delanoë	Mayor of Paris; 2014–2026	Succeeded by Emmanuel Grégoire
Party political offices
Preceded by Benoît Hamon	Socialist Party nominee for President of France; 2022	Succeeded by Raphaël Glucksmann
