= 1977 French municipal elections =

Municipal elections were held in France on 13 and 20 March 1977.

By 1977, President Valéry Giscard d'Estaing had been in power since 1974.

The left-wing coalition of the Communists and Socialists, united under a "government program" swept the elections. Out of 221 cities with over 30,000 inhabitants, the left won 155. The Socialists gained Rennes, Angers, Brest, Nantes, Villeurbanne, Pau, and Cannes. The Communists gained Le Mans, Reims, and Saint-Étienne. For the first time, green parties realized their first breakthroughs.

For the first time since 1789 French Revolution, elections were held to the mayorship of Paris. The former Prime Minister and RPR candidate Jacques Chirac was elected, defeating the Giscardian RI candidate Michel d'Ornano.

== Sources ==
- Locals 1977
