= Battle of Szikszó (1588) =

- Part of Ottoman–Hungarian war
Date	October 8, 1588
Location	near the town Szikszó, Kingdom of Hungary
Result	Hungarian victory

Belligerents
(Habsburg monarchy) Habsburg Monarchy: Kingdom of Hungary	Ottoman Empire

Commanders and leaders
Sigismund Rákóczi, Homonnai Drugeth István	Kara Ali bey Mustafa bey

Strength
2,500	12,000 plus cannons

Casualties and losses
200–300	1,700

The third and largest Battle of Szikszó was fought in October 1588 between the Kingdom of Hungary and the Ottoman Empire as part of the Ottoman–Hungarian wars. The Hungarian forces were fewer in number, but were victorious over the Ottomans. This unexpected victory was even mentioned by Emperor Rudolf decades after the battle. It was one of the most important Hungarian victories in the post-Mohács period.

== Events ==
In 1588, Pasha Sina of Buda marched with his soldiers towards Szikszó, which belonged to Hungary and refused to pay taxes to Porta. On October 8, Ottoman soldiers were already in the market town and looting when the border fort's rescue army led by Captain Sigismund Rákóczi from Eger arrived. In contrast to the Ottoman army of 11,000 the Hungarian-German army could have been 2,400–2,500. Despite the superiority, the latter still won. More than two thousand Ottomans and about 400–500 Hungarians and Germans were dead in the clash. In the wake of this incident, the Habsburg court in Prague suspended the payment of a “fair gift” of 30,000 gold a year, fixed in the Drinapolis peace, in response to which Porta threatened war.

== Prelude ==
In 1588, Szikszó already owed 1,000 gold tax, so Sinan Pasha of Buda organized a punitive tax collect campaign. The six thousand cavalry and the same number of infantry were led by Kara Ali Beg, the commander of Fehérvár, against Putnok and then, after he could not take it, set off in the direction of Szikszó.

== The battle ==
On the afternoon of October 8, the Pasha arrived under the city and immediately began the siege of the church fortress, which was protected by armed citizens. After two hours of siege, however, he was forced to retreat, because the rescue teams led by Major Sigismund Rákóczi from Eger arrived around 5 o'clock. With 2,000 Hungarian warriors and 500 German warriors. Kara Ali set fire to the church and the houses around it, then retreated to the Hernád-Velvet triangle, where he arranged his army. He arranged the riders on the right wing and the Janissaries on the left wing, setting up his four cannons in the middle. Rákóczi's army was led in the middle by István Drugeth Homonnai, chief of Zemplén, the most famous knight of Upper Hungary, the black shield horsemen attacked the left wing, while the German riflemen collided with the Janissaries. Kara Ali was seriously injured at the very beginning of the battle, so the command was taken over by Mustafa Szécsény, who also fell shortly afterwards. At that time the Janissaries broke through the army of the attacking Hungarian armies, István Drugeth was captured, and Rákóczi was already considering retreating, when the Hungarian left wing rushed to the aid of the Germans, and thus managed to repel the Janissaries. The order of war was completely disintegrated, and the struggle against man dragged on into the late night. By this time, the third Turkish chief, Bajazid basa, the leader of the Janissaries, had also fallen. Heling, the captain of the Germans, also fell. By 11, the Turkish armies ran away. The cavalry chased them to Sajó, and he also managed to free his Homons. 1,700 Turkish and hundreds of Hungarian and German soldiers died in the battle.

== Aftermath ==
The common grave where the dead were buried has since been called Törökhalom. With this victory, Sigismund Rákóczi became famous, Emperor Rudolf, even decades after the battle, mentioned the brilliant triumph, which was especially valuable because of the difference in the numbers of the two armies.
