= Bori people =

Indigenous tribe of the Adi people

The Bori are an indigenous tribe of the Adi people living in the districts of East Siang, Upper Siang, Siang and West Siang in the Indian state of Arunachal Pradesh.

== Bibliography ==
- Danggen, Bani. (2003). The kebang: A unique indigenous political institution of the Adis. Delhi: Himalayan Publishers. ISBN 81-86393-51-X
- Danggen, Bani. (2003). A book of conversation: A help book for English to Adi conversation. Itanagar: Himalayan Publishers. ISBN 81-86393-50-1.
- Mibang, Tamo; & Chaudhuri, S. K. (Eds.) (2004). Folk culture and oral literature from north-east India. New Delhi: Mittal. ISBN 81-7099-911-1.
- Nyori, Tai (1993). History and Culture of the Adis, Omsons Publications, New Delhi-110 027.
- Lego, N. N. (1992). British relations with the Adis, 1825-1947. New Delhi: Omsons Publications. ISBN 81-7117-097-8.
- Mibang, Tamo; & Abraham, P. T. (2001). An introduction to Adi language. Itanagar, Arunachal Pradesh: Himalayan Publishers. ISBN 81-86393-35-8.
