= Bory (Žďár nad Sázavou District) =

- Municipality
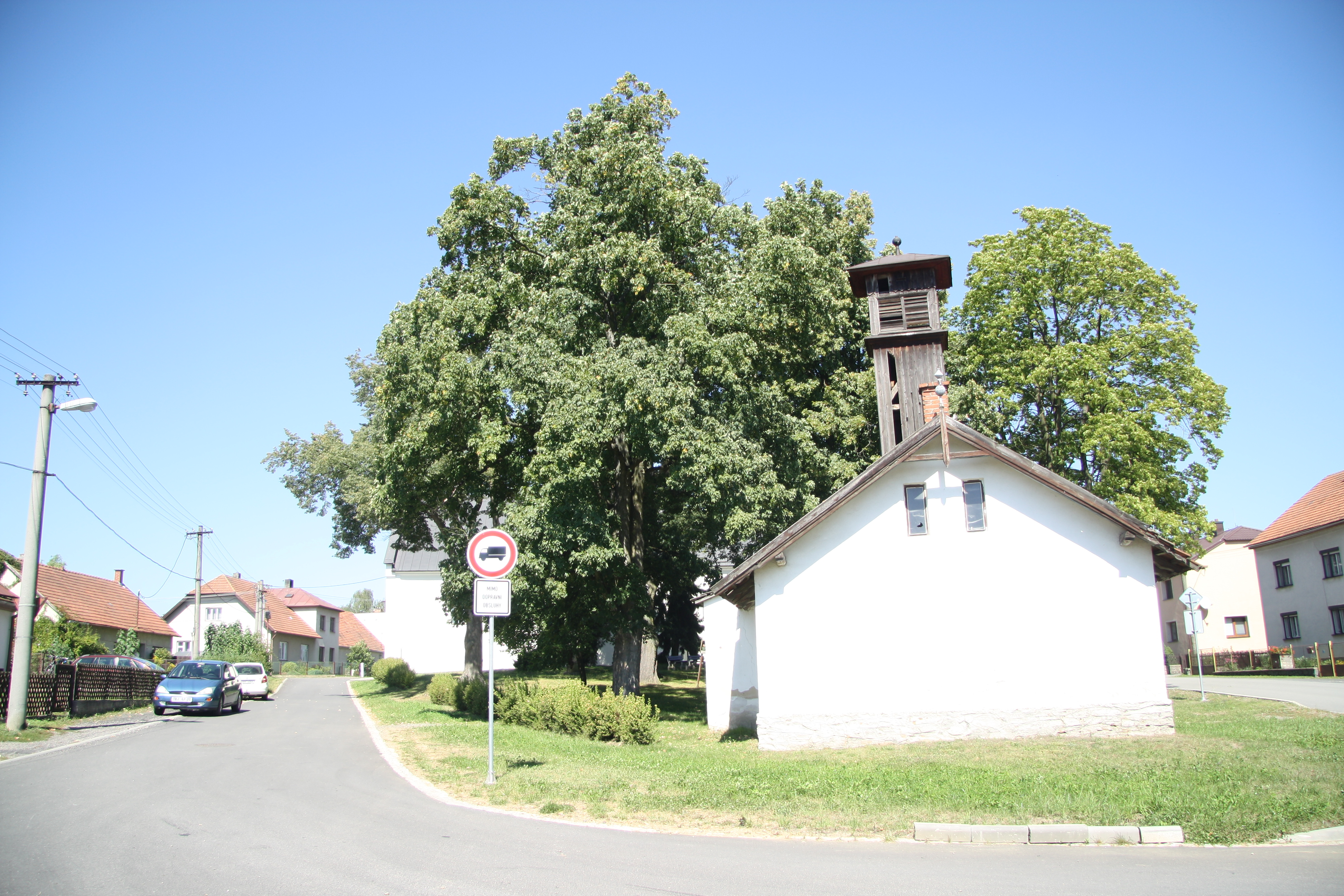
- Centre of Horní Bory

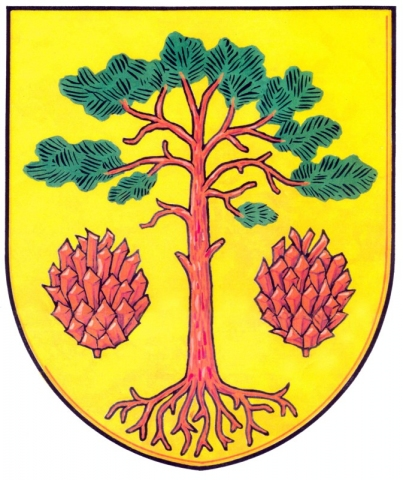
- Flag Coat of arms

- Location in the Czech Republic
- Coordinates: 49°25′34″N 16°1′42″E
- Country: Czech Republic
- Region: Vysočina
- District: Žďár nad Sázavou
- First mentioned: 1348

Area
  - Total: 16.47 km^{2} (6.36 sq mi)
- Elevation: 520 m (1,710 ft)

Population (2026-01-01)
  - Total: 765
  - Density: 46.4/km^{2} (120/sq mi)
- Time zone: UTC+1 (CET)
  - Summer (DST): UTC+2 (CEST)
- Postal code: 594 61
- Website: www.bory.cz

Bory is a municipality in Žďár nad Sázavou District in the Vysočina Region of the Czech Republic. It has about 800 inhabitants.

Bory lies approximately 17 kilometres (11 mi) south of Žďár nad Sázavou, 32 kilometres (20 mi) east of Jihlava, and 137 kilometres (85 mi) south-east of Prague.

== Administrative division ==
Bory consists of three municipal parts (in brackets population according to the 2021 census):

- Dolní Bory (377)
- Horní Bory (319)
- Cyrilov (48)

== Demographics ==
Historical population
Year	Pop.	±%
1869	862	—
1880	890	+3.2%
1890	858	−3.6%
1900	860	+0.2%
1910	832	−3.3%
1921	814	−2.2%
1930	804	−1.2%
1950	734	−8.7%
1961	742	+1.1%
1970	740	−0.3%
1980	692	−6.5%
1991	708	+2.3%
2001	756	+6.8%
2011	787	+4.1%
2021	744	−5.5%
Source: Censuses
