= André Borie =

French civil engineer

The bronze medal awarded by the Entrepreneurs de travaux publics featuring Borie.

André Borie (died 1971) was a French civil engineer who was involved in many public construction projects of the French state and helped to build part of the Mont Blanc tunnel. He was president of the Entrepreneurs de travaux publics who awarded a medal in his honour. He is said to have been an art collector and to have left his paintings to his daughter Andrée Borie.

== See also ==
- Giulano Ruffini
