= Boria Bal =

- Location in Afghanistan
- Coordinates: 37°10′12″N 67°14′8″E
- Country: Afghanistan
- Province: Balkh Province
- Time zone: + 4.30

Boria Bal is a village in Balkh Province in northern Afghanistan.

== See also ==
- Balkh Province
