= Bori, Pune =

Town in Maharashtra, India

Coordinates: 20.3482583°N 77.8565346°E

Bori Khurd is a town located in Pune district, Maharashtra, India. It is known for the discovery of some ancient human artefacts. The reported artefacts from Bori suggest the appearance of human beings in India around 1.4 million years ago (middle Pleistocene). This site is considered to be one of the earliest Lower Paleolithic sites in India.
