= Thin-le-Moutier =

- Commune
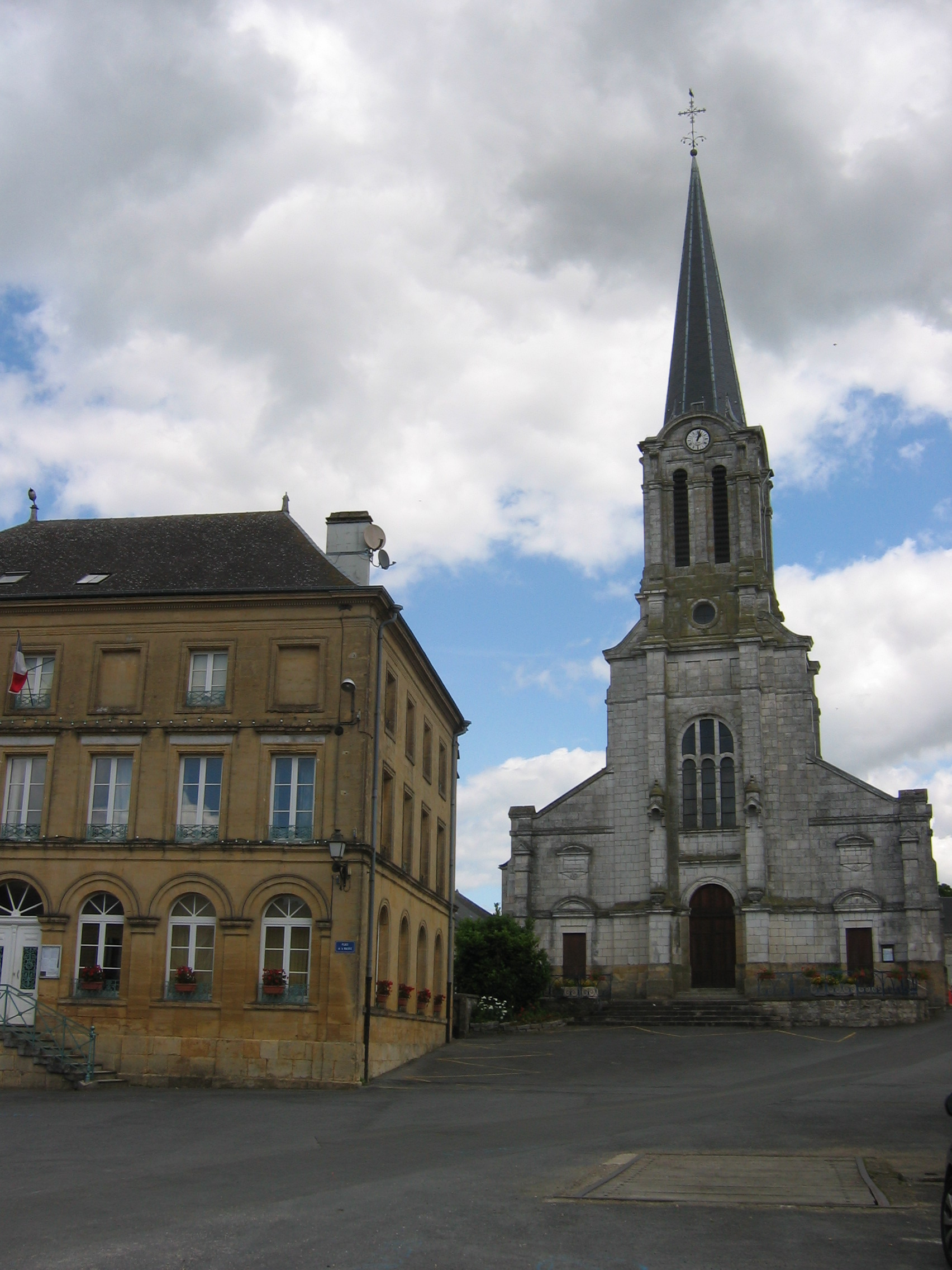
- The church in Thin-le-Moutier

- Coat of arms
- Location of Thin-le-Moutier
- Location within France Location within Grand Est
- Coordinates: 49°43′11″N 4°30′08″E
- Country: France
- Region: Grand Est
- Department: Ardennes
- Arrondissement: Charleville-Mézières
- Canton: Signy-l'Abbaye
- Intercommunality: Crêtes Préardennaises

Government
  - Mayor (2020–2026): Jean-François Marteaux
- Area^{1}: 39.72 km^{2} (15.34 sq mi)
- Elevation: 195 m (640 ft)
- Highest elevation: 312 m (1,024 ft)
- Lowest elevation: 174 m (571 ft)
- Population (2023): 702
  - Density: 17.7/km^{2} (45.8/sq mi)
- Time zone: UTC+01:00 (CET)
  - Summer (DST): UTC+02:00 (CEST)
- INSEE/Postal code: 08449 /08460
- ^{1} French Land Register data, which excludes lakes, ponds, glaciers > 1 km^{2} (0.386 sq mi or 247 acres) and river estuaries.

Thin-le-Moutier (French pronunciation: [tɛ̃ lə mutje]) is a commune in the Ardennes department and Grand Est region of north-eastern France.

== Population ==
Historical population
Year	Pop.	±% p.a.
1968	589	—
1975	507	−2.12%
1982	472	−1.02%
1990	496	+0.62%
1999	493	−0.07%
2007	579	+2.03%
2012	558	−0.74%
2017	623	+2.23%
2023	702	+2.01%
Source: INSEE

== See also ==
- Communes of the Ardennes department
