= Bory, Levice District =

Village and municipality in Slovakia

Bory Bori
- Municipality
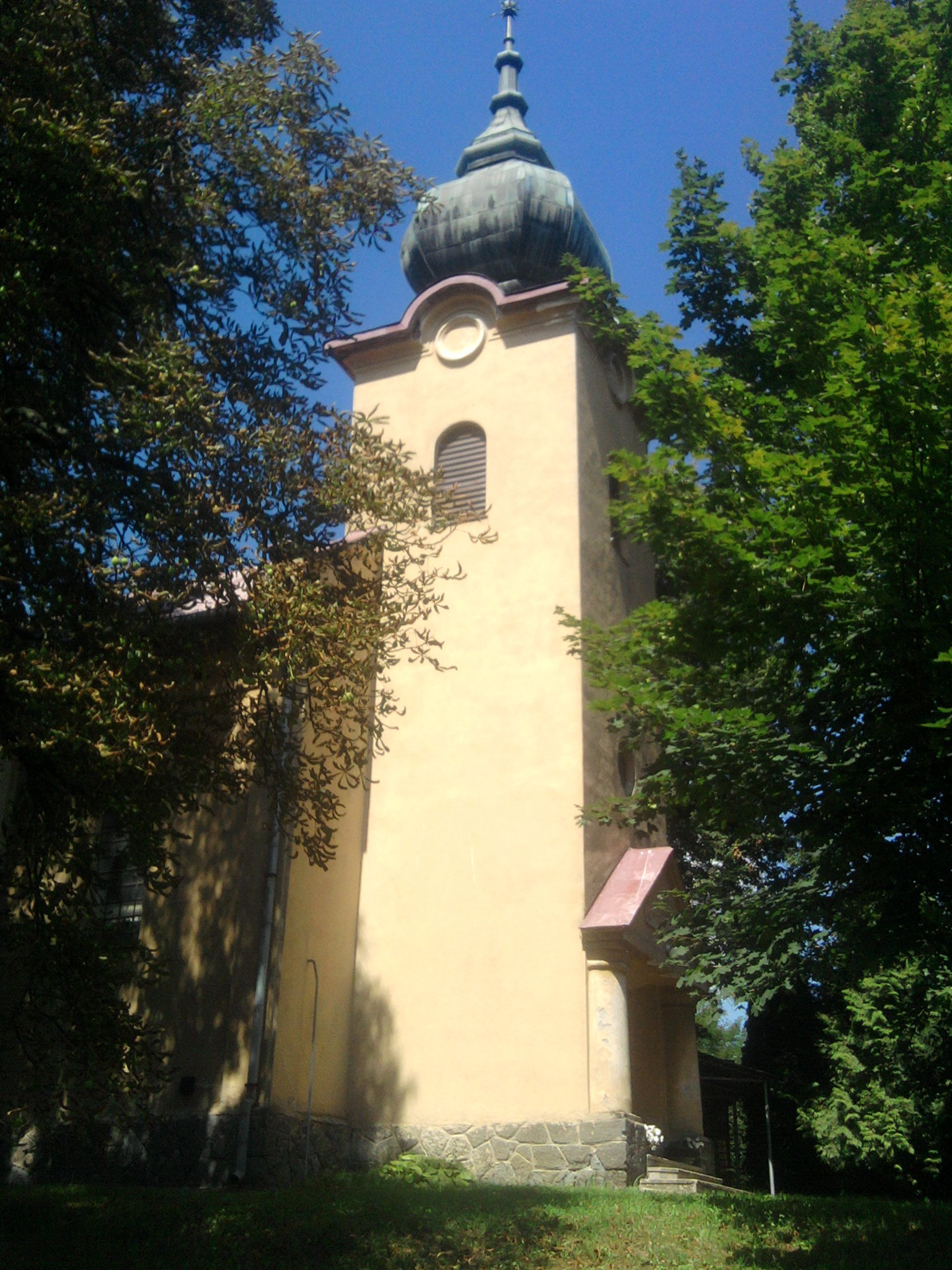
- Reform church

- Flag Coat of arms

- Location of Bory in the Nitra Region Location of Bory in Slovakia
- Country: Slovakia
- Region: Nitra Region
- District: Levice District
- First mentioned: 1135

Area
  - Total: 8.81 km^{2} (3.40 sq mi)
- Elevation: 153 m (502 ft)

Population (2025)
  - Total: 301
- Time zone: UTC+1 (CET)
  - Summer (DST): UTC+2 (CEST)
- Postal code: 935 87
- Area code: +421 36
- Vehicle registration plate (until 2022): LV
- Website: www.bory.sk

Bory (Hungarian: Bori; pronounced [ˈbori]) is a village and municipality in the Levice District in the Nitra Region of south-west Slovakia.

== History ==
In historical records the village was first mentioned in 1135. The village belonged to the noble family Bory de Bori és Borfői after which the village is named.

== Geography ==
The municipality lies at an altitude of 153 metres (502 ft) and covers an area of 8.81 km^{2} (3.40 sq mi) (2025).

== Population ==
Population statistic (10 years)
Year	1995	2005	2015	2025
Count	320	318	322	301
Difference		−0.62%	+1.25%	−6.52%

Population statistic
Year	2024	2025
Count	307	301
Difference		−1.95%

It has a population of 301 people (31 December 2025).

=== Ethnicity ===
Census 2021 (1+ %)
Ethnicity	Number	Fraction
Slovak	231	71.96%
Hungarian	89	27.72%
Not found out	14	4.36%
Total	321	

In year 2021 was 321 people by ethnicity 231 as Slovak, 89 as Hungarian, 14 as Not found out, 3 as Czech and 1 as Other.

Note on population: The difference values of population numbers in the table "Population statistic" and in the sections "Ethnicity" & "Religion" is caused by the use of various statistical methods.

=== Religion ===
Census 2021 (1+ %)
Religion	Number	Fraction
Roman Catholic Church	156	48.6%
Calvinist Church	73	22.74%
None	42	13.08%
Evangelical Church	30	9.35%
Not found out	10	3.12%
Baptists Church	4	1.25%
Total	321	

In year 2021 was 321 people by religion 156 from Roman Catholic Church, 73 from Calvinist Church, 42 from None, 30 from Evangelical Church, 10 from Not found out, 4 from Baptists Church, 3 from Greek Catholic Church, 1 from Eastern Orthodox Church, 1 from Paganism and natural spirituality and 1 from Christian Congregations in Slovakia.

== Facilities ==
The village has a public library and a football pitch.

== Genealogical resources ==
The records for genealogical research are available at the state archive "Statny

Archiv in Nitra, Slovakia"

- Roman Catholic church records (births/marriages/deaths): 1693-1895 (parish B)
- Lutheran church records (births/marriages/deaths): 1746-1896 (parish B)
- Reformated church records (births/marriages/deaths):1753-1897 (parish A)

== See also ==
- List of municipalities and towns in Slovakia
