= Demandice =

Demandice Deménd
- Municipality
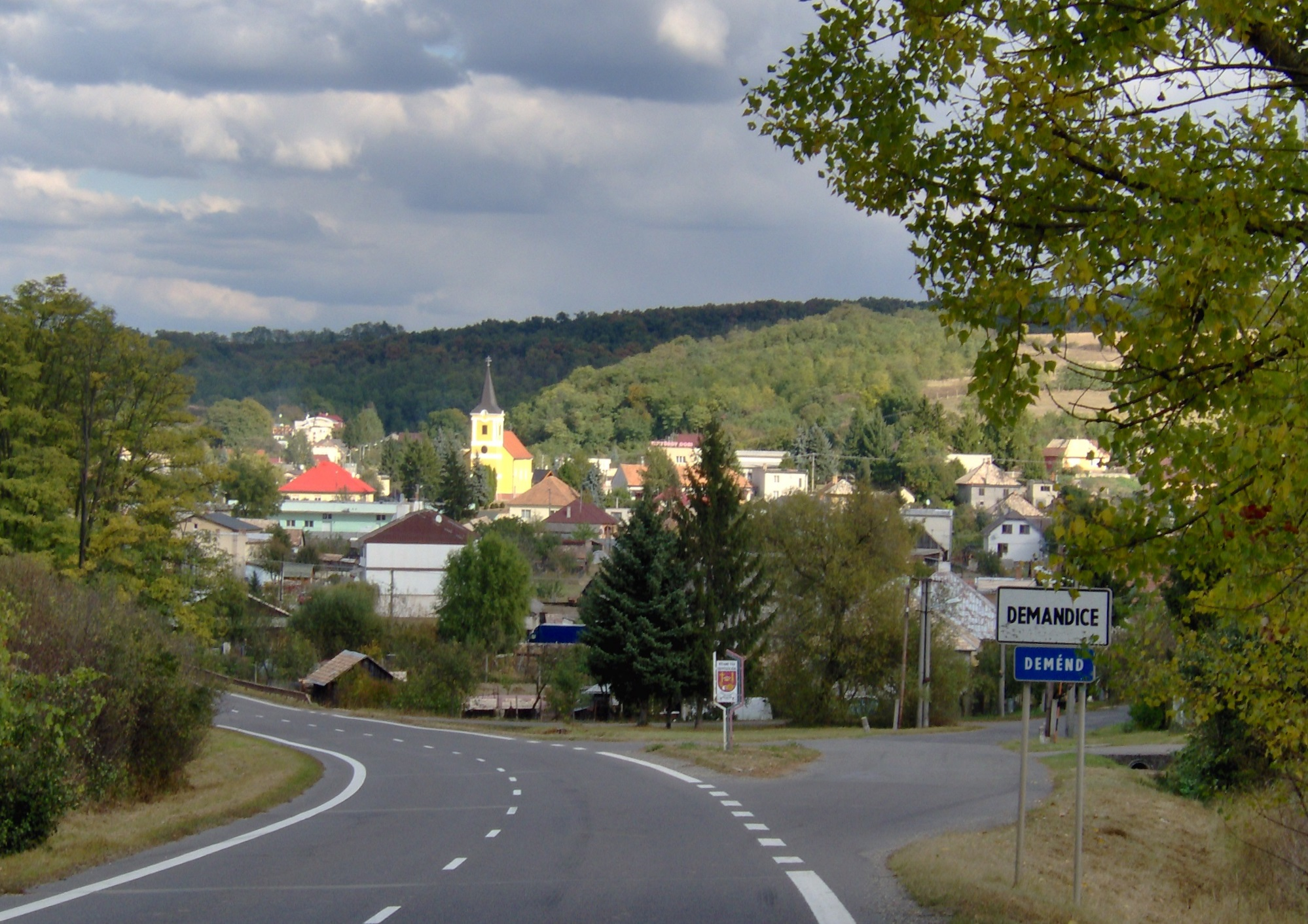

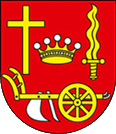
- Flag Coat of arms

- Location of Demandice in the Nitra Region Location of Demandice in Slovakia
- Coordinates: 48.13°N 18.78°E
- Country: Slovakia
- Region: Nitra Region
- District: Levice District
- First mentioned: 1291

Area
  - Total: 21.92 km^{2} (8.46 sq mi)
- Elevation: 133 m (436 ft)

Population (2025)
  - Total: 909
- Time zone: UTC+1 (CET)
  - Summer (DST): UTC+2 (CEST)
- Postal code: 935 85
- Area code: +421 36
- Vehicle registration plate (until 2022): LV
- Website: www.demandice.sk

Demandice (Hungarian: Deménd) is a village and municipality in the Levice District in the Nitra Region of south-west Slovakia.

== History ==
In historical records the village was first mentioned in 1291. Until the 16th century the village belonged to the noble family Deméndi de Theszéri. The Hungarian statistician András Vályi mentions Demandice in 1796 under the name Demanova as a Slovak village. Fényes Elek in 1851 likewise mentions it as a Slovak majority village with a population of 720 Catholics and 20 Protestants. By 1910 Demandice are mentioned as a majority Hungarian village with a population of 724.

== Geography ==
The municipality lies at an altitude of 133 metres (436 ft) and covers an area of 21.92 km^{2} (8.46 sq mi) (2025).

== Population ==
Population statistic (10 years)
Year	1995	2005	2015	2025
Count	1018	1011	979	909
Difference		−0.68%	−3.16%	−7.15%

Population statistic
Year	2024	2025
Count	915	909
Difference		−0.65%

It has a population of 909 people (31 December 2025).

=== Ethnicity ===
Census 2021 (1+ %)
Ethnicity	Number	Fraction
Slovak	716	74.12%
Hungarian	194	20.08%
Not found out	87	9%
Total	966	

In year 2021 was 966 people by ethnicity 716 as Slovak, 194 as Hungarian, 87 as Not found out, 7 as Romani, 2 as Czech, 1 as Italian, 1 as Russian, 1 as Greek and 1 as English.

Note on population: The difference values of population numbers in the table "Population statistic" and in the sections "Ethnicity" & "Religion" is caused by the use of various statistical methods.

=== Religion ===
Census 2021 (1+ %)
Religion	Number	Fraction
Roman Catholic Church	679	70.29%
None	166	17.18%
Not found out	84	8.7%
Evangelical Church	15	1.55%
Total	966	

In year 2021 was 966 people by religion 679 from Roman Catholic Church, 166 from None, 84 from Not found out, 15 from Evangelical Church, 6 from Calvinist Church, 3 from Jehovah's Witnesses, 3 from Greek Catholic Church, 2 from Christian Congregations in Slovakia, 2 from Other, 1 from Old Catholic Church, 1 from Paganism and natural spirituality, 1 from Other and not ascertained christian church, 1 from Islam, 1 from United Methodist Church and 1 from Ad hoc movements.

== Facilities ==
The village has a public library, a gym and a cinema.

== Genealogical resources ==
The records for genealogical research are available at the state archive "Statny Archiv in Banska Bystrica, Nitra,

Slovakia"

- Roman Catholic church records (births/marriages/deaths): 1732-1895 (parish A)
- Lutheran church records (births/marriages/deaths): 1746-1895 (parish B)

== See also ==
- List of municipalities and towns in Slovakia
