= Mayor of Paris =

Head of the executive branch of the Government of Paris

- Maire de Paris (French)
- Coat of arms of Paris

- Flag of the Mayor of Paris

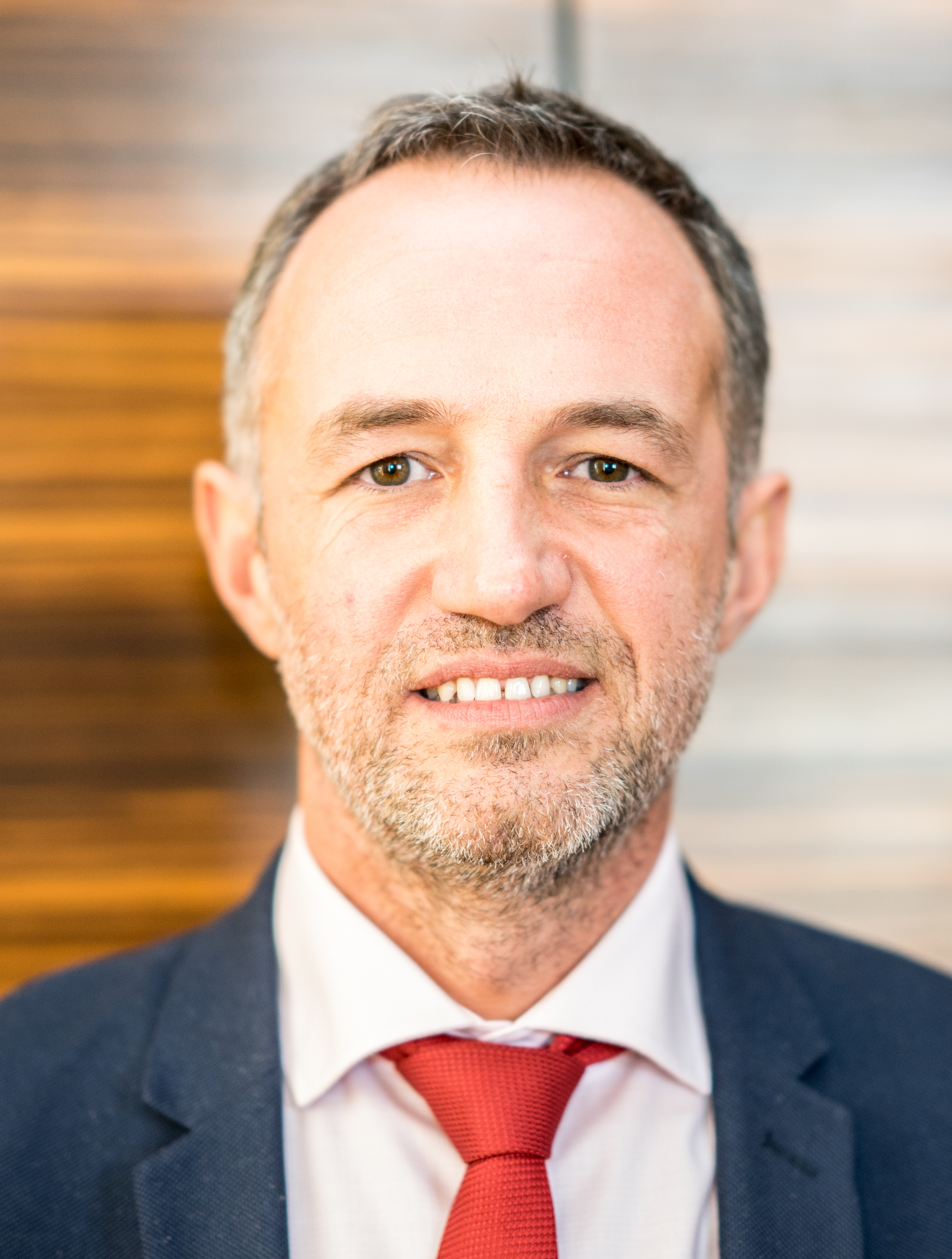
- Incumbent; Emmanuel Grégoire since 29 March 2026
- Residence: Hôtel de Ville
- Appointer: Elected by the Council of Paris
- Term length: 6 years, renewable indefinitely
- Inaugural holder: Jean Sylvain Bailly
- Formation: 15 July 1789; 20 March 1977
- Salary: €8,650 (monthly)
- Website: www.paris.fr

The mayor of Paris (French: Maire de Paris, [mɛʁ d(ə) paʁi]) is the chief executive of Paris, the capital and largest city in France.

The officeholder is responsible for the administration and management of the city, submits proposals and recommendations to the Council of Paris, is active in the enforcement of the city's ordinances, submits the city's annual budget and appoints city officers, department commissioners or directors, as well as members of city boards and commissions. During meetings of the Council of Paris, the mayor serves as the presiding officer, as it is the case in any other commune in France. Since Paris doubles as a department as well, the mayor also has the rank of a departmental council president.

Since 29 March 2026, Emmanuel Grégoire of the Socialist Party has been the Mayor of Paris.

== History ==
When the French Revolution began after the storming of the Bastille on 14 July 1789, the city insurgents murdered the last Provost of Paris (Provost of the Merchants), Jacques de Flesselles. Because the Provost's office was abolished as one of the first moves with the dissolution of the Ancien Régime, the insurgents established a revolutionary government called the "Commune of Paris", initially led by Jean Sylvain Bailly, the first titled "Mayor of Paris". The mayor's office was very important during the critical phases of the Revolution, and during Robespierre's Reign of Terror (1793–1794) it was decisive in the discovery and execution of all suspected counter-revolutionaries. In July 1794, after the 9th Thermidor, the coup d'état that deposed and executed Robespierre and his cronies, the office of Mayor was abolished since it was perceived to be too powerful.

After the February Revolution of 1848, the July Monarchy ended in favor of a new Republic, that restored the mayor's office. This renewal was however short, as the June Days uprising of the same year ended the possibility of creating a strong mayorship. The Executive Commission—charged to provisionally rule the country—preferred to transfer the mayor's powers to the Seine Prefect, appointed by Ministry of the Interior.

In 1870, once again, the office of Mayor of Paris was re-established and again did not survive long. The occasion for the re-creation was the fall of the Second Empire after the defeat in the Franco-Prussian War. The provisional Government of National Defense of Louis-Jules Trochu believed that a strong leadership in Paris would prevent sedition during the Prussian siege. After the definitive conquest of Paris by Prussians, popular discontent erupted in a new insurrectionary Commune which held socialist beliefs. Also, in case the Commune was finally suppressed, the new national government preferred to divide Paris into several distinct mayorships (one for each arrondissement) to prevent the city's total loss in the event of further revolts.

Thus, for all but 14 months from 1794 to 1977, Paris was the only commune of France without a mayor, and had less autonomy than even the smallest village. For most of the time from 1800 to 1977 (except briefly in 1848 and 1870–71), it was controlled directly by the departmental prefect (the prefect of the Seine before 1968 and prefect of Paris after 1968). In 1975 Parliament passed a bill re-establishing an elected mayor for Paris, beginning in 1977. The bill was signed by President Valéry Giscard d'Estaing on 31 December 1975. In March 1977, after the first formal municipal election, former Prime Minister Jacques Chirac was chosen as Mayor of Paris, a position he held until 1995, when he was elected President of France.

== List of officeholders ==
Notes † Died in office

No.	Mayor	Term in office Elections		Previous office	Party	Deputy
1	Jean Sylvain Bailly; 1736–1793 (Aged 57)	15 July 1789	18 November 1791	President of the National Assembly (1789)	Patriotic	Office did not exist
1	Jean Sylvain Bailly; 1736–1793 (Aged 57)	1789		President of the National Assembly (1789)	Patriotic	Office did not exist
2	Jérôme Pétion de Villeneuve; 1756–1794 (Aged 38)	18 November 1791	1 December 1792	Representative to Estates General for the Third Estate (1789)	Girondin	Office did not exist
2	Jérôme Pétion de Villeneuve; 1756–1794 (Aged 38)	1791		Representative to Estates General for the Third Estate (1789)	Girondin	Office did not exist
3	Henri Lefèvre d'Ormesson; 1751–1808 (Aged 56)	21 November 1792	8 December 1792	Judge in the 6th arrondissement (1790–1792)	Girondin	Office did not exist
3	Henri Lefèvre d'Ormesson; 1751–1808 (Aged 56)	1792 (November)		Judge in the 6th arrondissement (1790–1792)	Girondin	Office did not exist
4	Nicolas Chambon; 1748–1826 (Aged 78)	8 December 1792	14 February 1793	Paris Financial Administrator (1790–1791)	Girondin	Office did not exist
4	Nicolas Chambon; 1748–1826 (Aged 78)	1792 (December)		Paris Financial Administrator (1790–1791)	Girondin	Office did not exist
5	Jean-Nicolas Pache; 1746–1823 (Aged 77)	14 February 1793	10 May 1794	Minister of War (1792–1793)	Jacobin	Office did not exist
5	Jean-Nicolas Pache; 1746–1823 (Aged 77)	1793		Minister of War (1792–1793)	Jacobin	Office did not exist
6	Jean-Baptiste Fleuriot-Lescot †; 1761–1794 (Aged 33)	10 May 1794	27 July 1794	Public Prosecutor of the Revolutionary Tribunal (1793–1794)	Jacobin	Office did not exist
6	Jean-Baptiste Fleuriot-Lescot †; 1761–1794 (Aged 33)	1794		Public Prosecutor of the Revolutionary Tribunal (1793–1794)	Jacobin	Office did not exist
Office abolished (1794–1848)
7	Louis Antoine Pagès; 1803–1878 (Aged 75)	24 February 1848	9 March 1848	MP for Eure (1846–1848)	Moderate Republican	Office did not exist
7	Louis Antoine Pagès; 1803–1878 (Aged 75)	N/A		MP for Eure (1846–1848)	Moderate Republican	Office did not exist
8	Armand Marrast; 1801–1852 (Aged 50)	9 March 1848	19 July 1848	MP for Haute-Garonne (1848–1849)	Moderate Republican	Office did not exist
8	Armand Marrast; 1801–1852 (Aged 50)	N/A		MP for Haute-Garonne (1848–1849)	Moderate Republican	Office did not exist
Office abolished (1848–1870)
9	Étienne Arago; 1802–1892 (Aged 90)	4 September 1870	15 November 1870	MP for Pyrénées-Orientales (1848–1851)	Radical Republican	Office did not exist
9	Étienne Arago; 1802–1892 (Aged 90)	N/A		MP for Pyrénées-Orientales (1848–1851)	Radical Republican	Office did not exist
10	Jules Ferry; 1832–1893 (Aged 60)	15 November 1870	18 March 1871	MP for Seine (1869–1870)	Moderate Republican	Office did not exist
10	Jules Ferry; 1832–1893 (Aged 60)	N/A		MP for Seine (1869–1870)	Moderate Republican	Office did not exist
Office abolished (1871–1977)
11	Jacques Chirac; 1932–2019 (Aged 86)	20 March 1977	13 March 1983	Prime Minister of France (1974–1976)	Rally for the Republic	Christian de La Malène
11	Jacques Chirac; 1932–2019 (Aged 86)	1977		Prime Minister of France (1974–1976)	Rally for the Republic	Christian de La Malène
11	Jacques Chirac; 1932–2019 (Aged 86)	13 March 1983	19 March 1989	Prime Minister of France (1974–1976)	Rally for the Republic	Jean Tiberi
11	Jacques Chirac; 1932–2019 (Aged 86)	1983		Prime Minister of France (1974–1976)	Rally for the Republic	Jean Tiberi
11	Jacques Chirac; 1932–2019 (Aged 86)	19 March 1989	16 May 1995	Prime Minister of France (1974–1976)	Rally for the Republic	Jean Tiberi
11	Jacques Chirac; 1932–2019 (Aged 86)	1989		Prime Minister of France (1974–1976)	Rally for the Republic	Jean Tiberi
12	Jean Tiberi; 1935–2025 (Aged 90)	22 May 1995	25 March 2001	MP for Paris (1976–2012)	Rally for the Republic	Jacques Dominati
12	Jean Tiberi; 1935–2025 (Aged 90)	1995		MP for Paris (1976–2012)	Rally for the Republic	Jacques Dominati
13	Bertrand Delanoë; Born 1950	25 March 2001	16 March 2008	Senator for Paris (1995–2001)	Socialist Party	Anne Hidalgo
13	Bertrand Delanoë; Born 1950	2001		Senator for Paris (1995–2001)	Socialist Party	Anne Hidalgo
13	Bertrand Delanoë; Born 1950	16 March 2008	5 April 2014	Senator for Paris (1995–2001)	Socialist Party	Anne Hidalgo
13	Bertrand Delanoë; Born 1950	2008		Senator for Paris (1995–2001)	Socialist Party	Anne Hidalgo
14	Anne Hidalgo; Born 1959	5 April 2014	3 July 2020	Deputy Mayor of Paris (2001–2014)	Socialist Party	Bruno Julliard
14	Anne Hidalgo; Born 1959	2014		Deputy Mayor of Paris (2001–2014)	Socialist Party	Bruno Julliard
14	Anne Hidalgo; Born 1959	2014		Deputy Mayor of Paris (2001–2014)	Socialist Party	Emmanuel Grégoire
14	Anne Hidalgo; Born 1959	3 July 2020	29 March 2026	Deputy Mayor of Paris (2001–2014)	Socialist Party	Emmanuel Grégoire
14	Anne Hidalgo; Born 1959	3 July 2020	29 March 2026	Deputy Mayor of Paris (2001–2014)	Socialist Party	Patrick Bloche
14	Anne Hidalgo; Born 1959	2020		Deputy Mayor of Paris (2001–2014)	Socialist Party	Patrick Bloche
15	Emmanuel Grégoire; Born 1977	29 March 2026	Incumbent	MP for Paris (2024–2026)	Socialist Party	Lamia El Aaraje
15	Emmanuel Grégoire; Born 1977	2026		MP for Paris (2024–2026)	Socialist Party	Lamia El Aaraje

== See also ==
- Administration of Paris
