= Compagno =

Compagno is a surname. Notable people with the surname include:

- Andrea Compagno (born 1996), Italian footballer
- Emily Compagno (born 1979), American attorney and television host
- Leonard Compagno (1943–2024), American ichthyologist
- Scipione Compagno (c. 1624–after 1680), Italian painter
- Tony Compagno (1921–1971), American football player
