= Dissard =

Dissard may refer to:

== People ==
- Clotilde Dissard (1873-1919), French journalist, feminist
- Marianne Dissard (born 1969), French singer, lyricist, author, filmmaker
- Marie-Louise Dissard (1881-1957), member of the French Resistance
- Paul Dissard (1852–1926), French art historian
