= Auguste Allmer =

French historian and epigrapher (1815–1899)

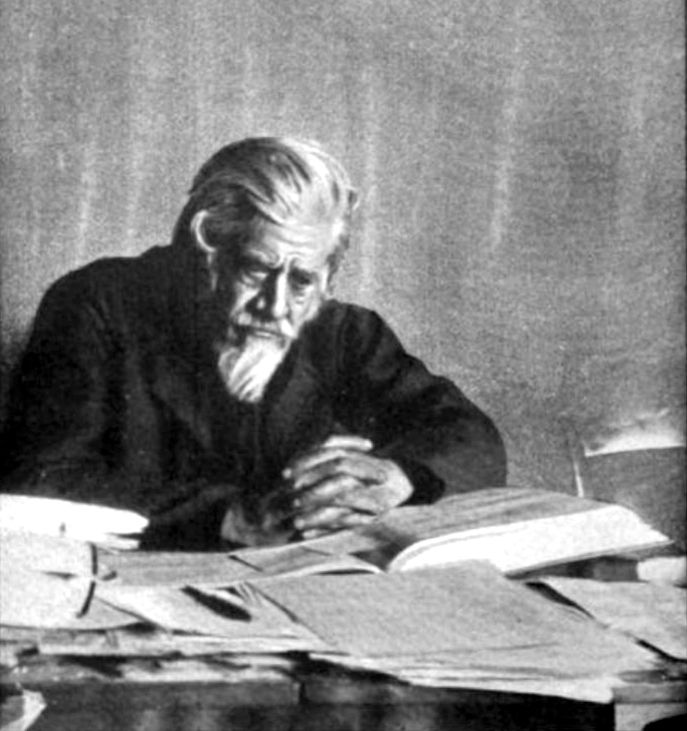
- Auguste Allmer in 1899
- Born: Louis Christophe Auguste Allmer; 8 July 1815; Paris
- Died: 27 November 1899 (aged 84); Lyon
- Occupations: Historian; Epigrapher

Louis Christophe Auguste Allmer (8 July 1815 – 27 November 1899) was a 19th-century French historian and epigrapher. He contributed with Paul Dissard to changing a fledgling science by confronting archaeological evidence and providing reference documentation.

== Biography ==
In 1835, he became, like his father, a tax collector for the Ministry of Finance, among others, in Saint-Priest (Rhône). Then, when he retired in 1868, he devoted himself to epigraphy and archeology. He was particularly interested in Roman remains unearthed by the drilling of the PLM line in Lyon. In his time he was one of the leading specialists of Latin epigraphy, in the tradition of Léon Renier.

On 2 April 1875, he was made a chevalier of the Légion d'honneur as author of significant work in the field of archeology.

From 1876, he became correspondent member of the Académie des inscriptions et belles-lettres. Two years later, the city of Lyon appointed him a curator of its museums of epigraphy, numismatics and sigillography.

== Main publications ==
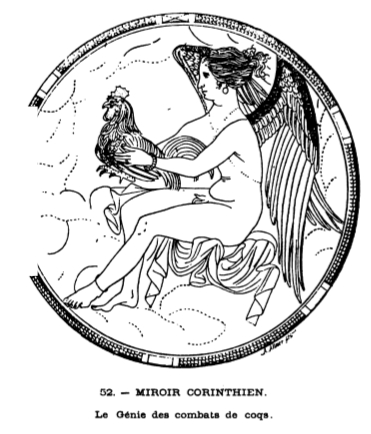
Extract from the Catalogue sommaire des musées de la ville de Lyon (1887), drawing by Adrien Allmer.

- 1858: Sur quelques inscriptions antiques.
- 1875: (u/dir.) Atlas des inscriptions antiques et du Moyen Age de Vienne en Dauphiné, drawing by Adrien Allmer.
- 1888: Trion: antiquités découvertes en 1885,1886 et antérieurement au quartier de Lyon dit de Trion.
- 1888–1893: Inscriptions antiques. Musée de Lyon, tome I à V.
- 1889: Les gestes du Dieu Auguste, d'après l'inscription du temple d'Ancyre.
- 1893: Inscriptions antiques de Nîmes (by Eugène Germer-Durand; edited, with F. Germer-Durand).
