= Léon Renier =

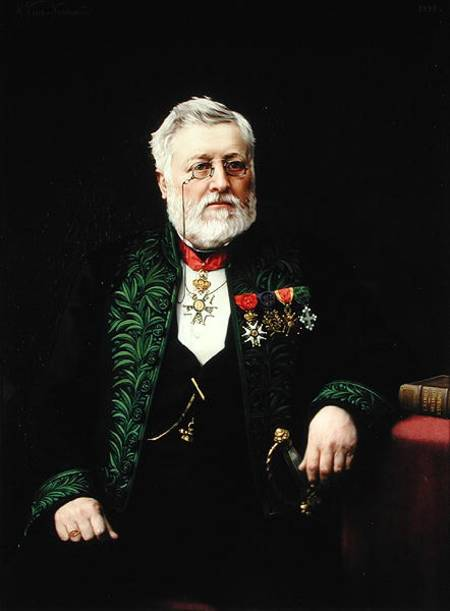
Leon Renier

Charles Alphonse Leon Renier (2 May 1809, Charleville – 11 June 1885, Paris) was a 19th-century French historian specialist of Latin epigraphy.

Arriving in Paris in 1838, he worked at the Dictionnaire encyclopédique de la France (edited by Le Bas) which directed his career towards philology and archeology. Elected a member of the Société des Antiquaires de France in 1845, he founded the same year a philology review, literature and ancient history and is charged about the same time to lead the new edition of the Encyclopédie moderne of Courtin.

Appointed assistant librarian at the library of the Sorbonne 1847, he became Conservative administrator. Commissioned by the Institute in 1850-1852, specifically the collection of Roman inscriptions of Algeria,

In 1856 he was elected member of the Académie des Inscriptions et Belles-Lettres. He was made chair of epigraphy and Roman antiquities of the College de France 1861 and Ecole pratique des hautes études (Philology section) in 1864 and honorary president of the archeology of the University Library, President of Historical and Philological Sciences at the School of Advanced Studies, member of the Société des Antiquaires de France.

He directed the publication of the 5th volume of the Catacombs of Rome and was one of the first sent to Algeria in order to collect and study Roman inscriptions there. He was part of the Commission published the Complete Works of Bartolomeo Borghesi and gave a classic edition of Theocritus and several other Greek writers, with translation.
