= Paul Dissard =

French art historian

Paul Dissard (1852–1926) was a French art historian, a specialist of Gallo-Roman culture. An epigrapher and curator at the Museum of Fine Arts of Lyon, he contributed with Auguste Allmer to change a fledgling science by confronting archaeological evidence and providing a reference documentation.

== Publications ==
Articles

- Quelques médailles romaines inédites, Gobbaerts, Brussels, 1880, 7 p.
- Jetons des Compagnies de chevaliers - Tireurs de Lyon au XVIIIe siècle, 7 p., in Lyon-Revue n° 2, A. Storck impr., Lyon, July 1880.
- Notice sur la confrérie des Pénitents de Notre-Dame du Confalon, in Lyon-Revue n° 6, 7, 8, 10 & 11, A. Storck impr., Lyon, December, January, February, April and May 1881.
- Épigraphie lyonnaise - Inscriptions funéraires de la rue de Trion, 7 p, in Lyon-Revue n° 21, A. Storck impr., Lyon, 30 September 1882.
- With A. Vingtrinier, Épigraphie lyonnaise. Inscriptions funéraires de la Rue de Trion. Lettre au sujet de deux inscriptions lyonnaises du Musée de Lyon, collect° Opuscules lyonnais n° 4, H. Georg, Lyon, 1883, 23 p.
- With Émile Espérandieu, Ain - Calendrier de Coligny, Saint-Maixent, 1898.
- Additions et corrections au texte de l'inscription gauloise trouvée à Coligny, Ain, Imprimerie nationale, Paris, Lyon, 1898, 48 p.
- Dissard, Paul (1904). "Quatre inscriptions latines découvertes à Lyon". Comptes rendus des séances de l'Académie des Inscriptions et Belles-Lettres. No. 4. pp. 446–449..
- Epigraphie, in coll. "Comité local du Congrès de Lyon 1906 - Association française pour l'avancement des sciences", Les Musées de Lyon, pp. 36–49, A. Rey & cie. impr., Lyon, 1906.
- Coll., Histoire des églises et chapelles de Lyon, Librairie Roux & H. Lardanchet, Lyon, 1908 & 1909, 2 vol.

Catalogues

- with Auguste Allmer, Trion : antiquités découvertes en 1885 et antérieurement au quartier de Lyon dit de Trion, Association typographique, Lyon, 1887,
  - réed. Baillière, Paris, 1898, 2 vol.
- Les inscriptions antiques du Musée des beaux-arts de Lyon, L. Delaroche & cie., Lyon, 1888-1893, 5 vol., 2237 p.
- Peinture moderne, in Catalogue sommaire des musées de la Ville de Lyon, Museum of Fine Arts of Lyon, Lyon, 1899.
- Sculpture moderne, in Catalogue sommaire des musées de la Ville de Lyon, Musée des beaux-arts de Lyon, Lyon, 1899.
- Catalogue des plombs antiques - Collection Récamier : sceaux, tessères, monnaies, objets divers., Rollin, Paris, 1905, 328 p.
- Les musées de Lyon : peinture, sculpture, art antique, épigraphie, sigillographie, Moyen Âge, Renaissance, Lyon, 1906,
  - reprint Le Musée de Lyon. Les peintures, H. Laurens, Paris, 1912, 72 p.
  - reprint Nabu Press, Charleston, South Carolina, May 2010.

== See also ==
- Coligny calendar
- Museum of Fine Arts of Lyon
