= Scipione Compagno =

Italian painter

Scipione Compagno was an Italian painter. He was born in Naples in about 1624, and was still living in 1680. He was a pupil of Aniello Falcone and Salvator Rosa, and his drawings are held in esteem. The Kunsthistorisches Museum Wien in Vienna contains two of his works – the Eruption of Vesuvius and the Beheading of St. Januarius.
