= Ferdinand de Bertier de Sauvigny =

French politician (1782–1864)

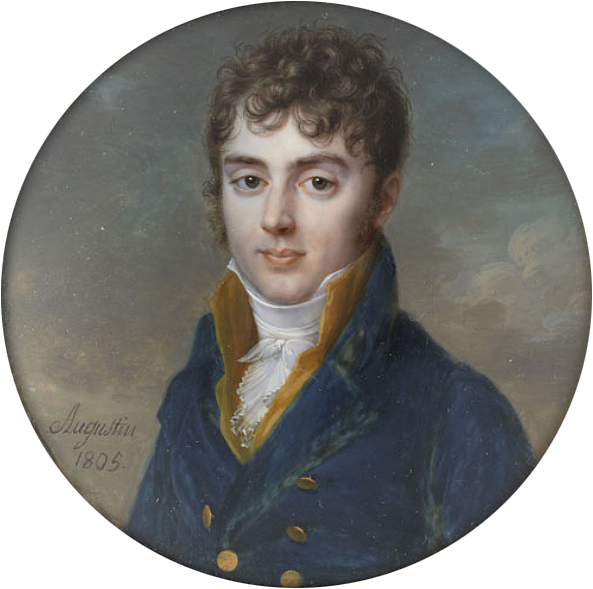
- Portrait by Jean-Baptiste Jacques Augustin, 1805.
- Born: 13 May 1782; Paris, France
- Died: 5 September 1864 (aged 82); Versailles, France
- Occupation: Politician
- Spouse: Thaïs Le Fèvre d'Ormesson
- Parent: Louis Bénigne François Bertier de Sauvigny
- Relatives: Joseph Foullon de Doué (maternal grandfather); Henri Lefèvre d'Ormesson (father-in-law)

Ferdinand de Bertier de Sauvigny (May 13, 1782-September 5, 1864) was a French aristocrat and politician.

== Early life ==
Ferdinand de Bertier de Sauvigny was born on 13 May 1782 in Paris, France. His father, Louis Bénigne François Bertier de Sauvigny, was murdered during the French Revolution of 1789.

== Career ==
De Bertier de Sauvigny served in the Armée des Émigrés in 1791. By 1823, he served under Louis Antoine, Duke of Angoulême in the Hundred Thousand Sons of Saint Louis.

De Bertier de Sauvigny served as the Prefect of Calvados from 1815 to 1816, and as the Prefect of Isère from 1816 to 1817.

De Bertier de Sauvigny served as a member of the Chamber of Deputies from 1815 to 1816, and from 1824 to 1827. He also served as a member of the Conseil d'État from 1822 to 1824, and from 1828 to 1830.

De Bertier de Sauvigny was the founder of the Chevaliers de la Foi, a Roman Catholic ultra-royalist secret society, in 1810. One of his goals was to bring the House of Bourbon back in power, and he succeeded when Louis XVIII became King of France in 1815. Moreover, he wanted the Pope, not the head of state, to be the ultimate religious authority in France.

== Personal life and death ==
De Bertier de Sauvigny married Thaïs Le Fèvre d'Ormesson, the daughter of Henri Lefèvre d'Ormesson. He died on 5 September 1864 in Versailles, France.

== See also ==
- Land registry of Bertier de Sauvigny
