= Chapet =

- Commune
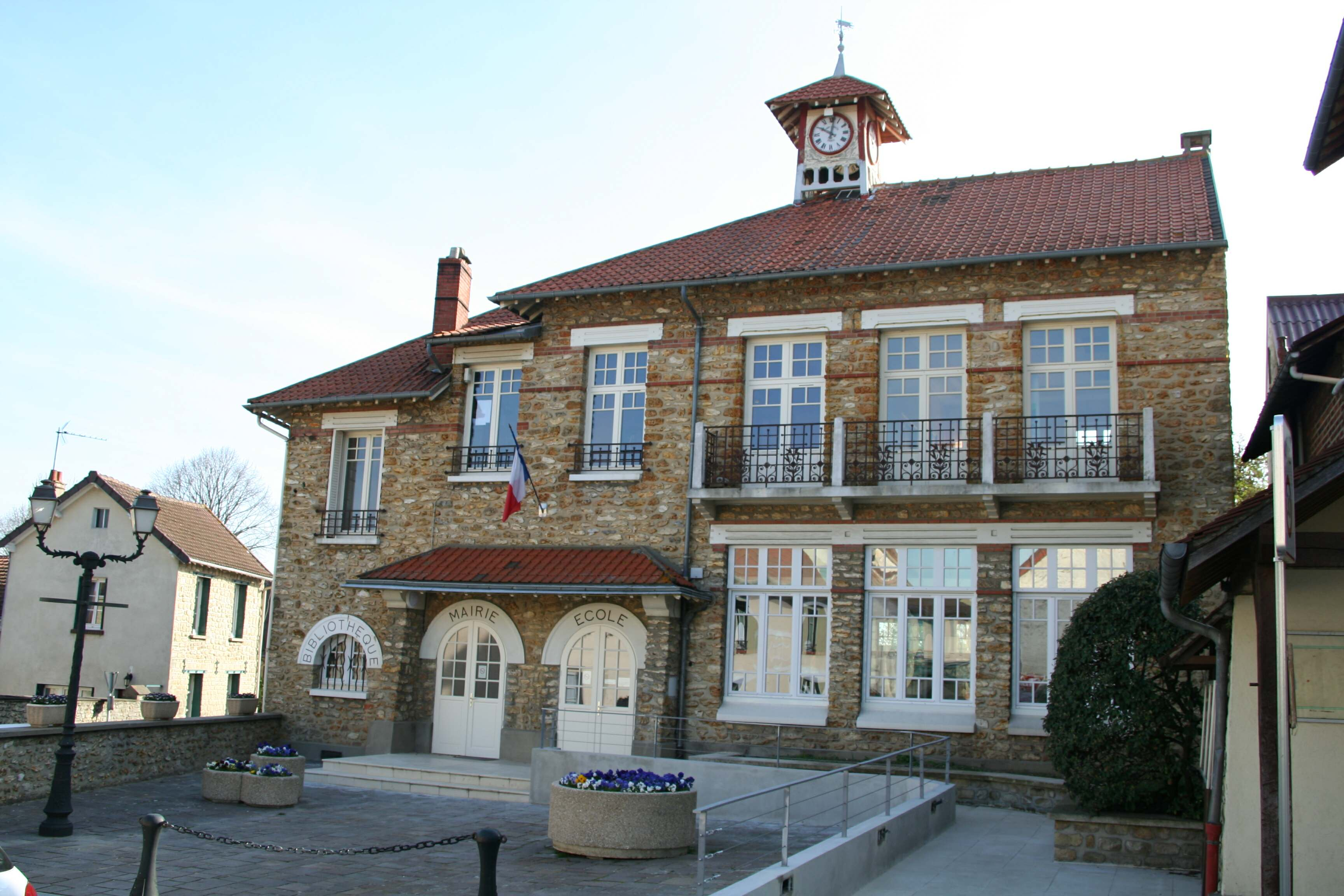
- Town hall
- Location of Chapet
- Location within France Location within Île-de-France (region)
- Coordinates: 48°58′02″N 1°56′04″E
- Country: France
- Region: Île-de-France
- Department: Yvelines
- Arrondissement: Mantes-la-Jolie
- Canton: Les Mureaux
- Intercommunality: CU Grand Paris Seine et Oise

Government
  - Mayor (2020–2026): Benoît de Laurens
- Area^{1}: 5.10 km^{2} (1.97 sq mi)
- Elevation: 59 m (194 ft)
- Highest elevation: 121 m (397 ft)
- Lowest elevation: 29 m (95 ft)
- Population (2023): 1,331
  - Density: 261/km^{2} (676/sq mi)
- Time zone: UTC+01:00 (CET)
  - Summer (DST): UTC+02:00 (CEST)
- INSEE/Postal code: 78140 /78130
- ^{1} French Land Register data, which excludes lakes, ponds, glaciers > 1 km^{2} (0.386 sq mi or 247 acres) and river estuaries.

Chapet (French pronunciation: [ʃapɛ]) is a commune in the Yvelines department in the Île-de-France region in north-central France, about 16 km east of Mantes-la-Jolie. It is on the Normandy motorway (A13).

The commune's neighbours are Verneuil-sur-Seine to the northeast, to the east is Vernouillet, with Morainvilliers to the southeast, Ecquevilly to the southwest, and to the northwest is Les Mureaux.

It is a largely rural and agricultural community; the land is divided mainly between arable crops (cereals, oilseed rape) with some woods and forest.

The parish church of Saint-Denis dates from the 12th century. The bell-tower was added in 1859.

== Climate ==
Climate data for Chapet (1995-2010 averages)
Month	Jan	Feb	Mar	Apr	May	Jun	Jul	Aug	Sep	Oct	Nov	Dec	Year
Record high °C (°F)	15.7 (60.3)	18.5 (65.3)	23.3 (73.9)	30.2 (86.4)	34.7 (94.5)	38.6 (101.5)	40.8 (105.4)	40.0 (104.0)	34.7 (94.5)	30.9 (87.6)	24.3 (75.7)	17.8 (64.0)	40.8 (105.4)
Mean daily maximum °C (°F)	7.3 (45.1)	8.8 (47.8)	12.0 (53.6)	15.8 (60.4)	19.5 (67.1)	23.5 (74.3)	25.8 (78.4)	25.5 (77.9)	22.0 (71.6)	16.9 (62.4)	11.0 (51.8)	7.1 (44.8)	16.3 (61.3)
Daily mean °C (°F)	4.4 (39.9)	5.2 (41.4)	7.5 (45.5)	10.0 (50.0)	13.7 (56.7)	17.0 (62.6)	19.2 (66.6)	19.1 (66.4)	15.7 (60.3)	12.2 (54.0)	7.6 (45.7)	4.4 (39.9)	11.4 (52.5)
Mean daily minimum °C (°F)	1.6 (34.9)	1.6 (34.9)	2.9 (37.2)	4.3 (39.7)	8.0 (46.4)	10.5 (50.9)	12.5 (54.5)	12.7 (54.9)	9.4 (48.9)	7.6 (45.7)	4.1 (39.4)	1.7 (35.1)	6.4 (43.5)
Record low °C (°F)	−12.1 (10.2)	−16.6 (2.1)	−15.1 (4.8)	−6.2 (20.8)	−1.6 (29.1)	0.7 (33.3)	3.6 (38.5)	2.7 (36.9)	−1.2 (29.8)	−6.0 (21.2)	−10.6 (12.9)	−12.0 (10.4)	−16.6 (2.1)
Average precipitation mm (inches)	40.3 (1.59)	41.4 (1.63)	42.5 (1.67)	42.4 (1.67)	57.5 (2.26)	49.2 (1.94)	57.8 (2.28)	53.0 (2.09)	36.3 (1.43)	65.5 (2.58)	55.0 (2.17)	61.4 (2.42)	602.3 (23.71)
Average precipitation days (≥ 1.0 mm)	9.3	9.5	9.5	8.8	9.5	8.3	8.1	8.4	6.5	10.3	11.1	12.2	111.5
Source: Meteociel

== See also ==
- Communes of the Yvelines department
