= Aubette de Meulan =

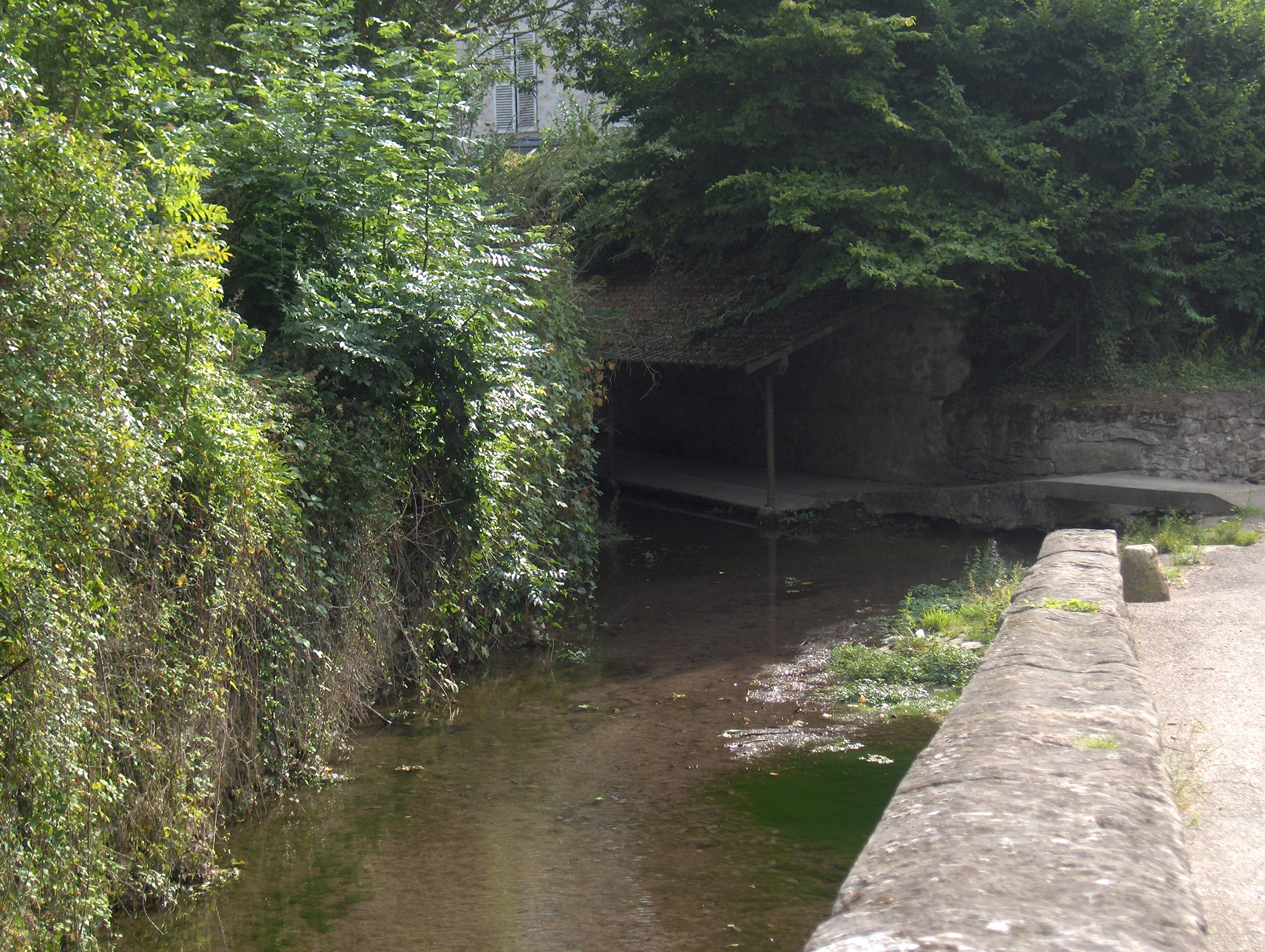
- Aubette de Meulan passing through a lavoir in Avernes.

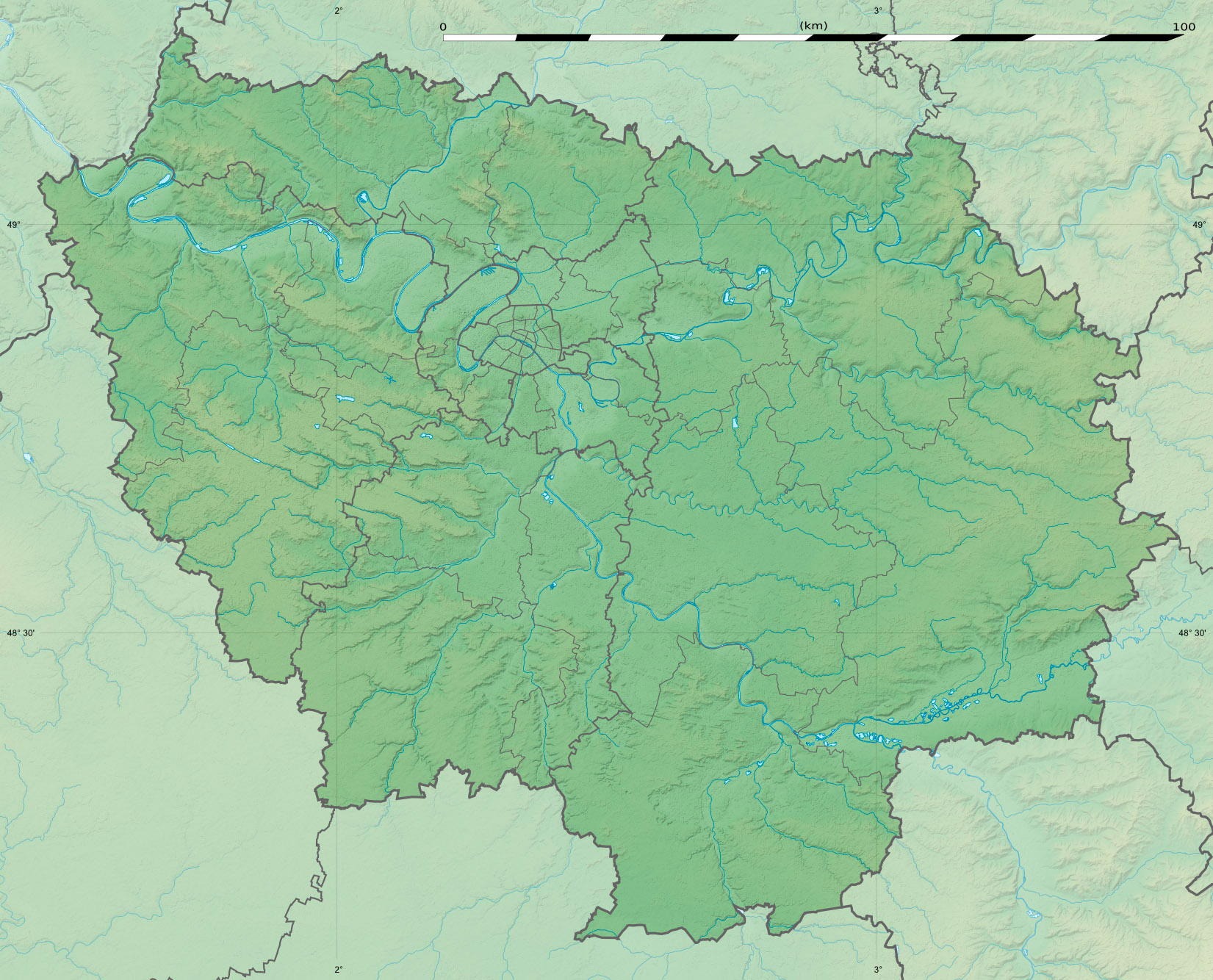
- Location within France Location within Île-de-France (region)

Location
- Country: France

Physical characteristics
- Source
  - location: French Vexin
  - elevation: 119 m (390 ft)
- Mouth
  - location: Seine
  - coordinates: 49°00′13″N 1°54′19″E
- Length: 20 km (12 mi)
- Basin size: 147 km^{2} (57 mi^{2})

Basin features
- Progression: Seine→ English Channel

Aubette de Meulan (French pronunciation: [obɛt də mølɑ̃], literally Aubette of Meulan) is a French river that begins at Avernes in Val-d'Oise, flows through Vigny, and empties into the Seine in Meulan-en-Yvelines. One commune is named after this river: Tessancourt-sur-Aubette (Yvelines).

It is 20 km long.
