= Procès-verbal =

Legal Term

Procès-verbal (French procès, process, Late Latin verbalis, from verbum, word) is a legal term with a number of meanings:

== In law ==
- In Francophone countries, such as France, the term procès-verbal is frequently abbreviated as "P.V.", and most commonly means a ticket or a fine issued by a police or other law enforcement officer. Despite the use of verbal in the term, a P.V. is often a paper ticket or citation; in this case verbal comes from Latin verbalis, where it means "relating to a word or words", and simply indicates the incident has been officially documented or written down.
- In French, Belgian and Dutch law, a procès-verbal (Dutch: proces verbaal) is a detailed authenticated account drawn up by a magistrate, police officer, or other person having authority of acts or proceedings done in the exercise of his duty.
- In a criminal charge, a procès-verbal is a statement of the facts of the case
- Procès-verbal can also mean the written minutes of a meeting or assembly.
- In Canada, a procès verbal d'infraction is a misdemeanor police citation or ticket.

== In international law and diplomacy ==
- In international law and diplomacy, a procès-verbal is the process of adopting corrections to the text of a treaty, by mutual agreement of the parties. As such it is a process of amendment, but is reserved for minor and non-controversial technical corrections that do not change the substance of the treaty.

== See also ==
- Travaux préparatoires
- Land registry of Bertier de Sauvigny
