= Hôtel de Ville, Les Mureaux =

Town hall in Les Mureaux, France

Hôtel de Ville
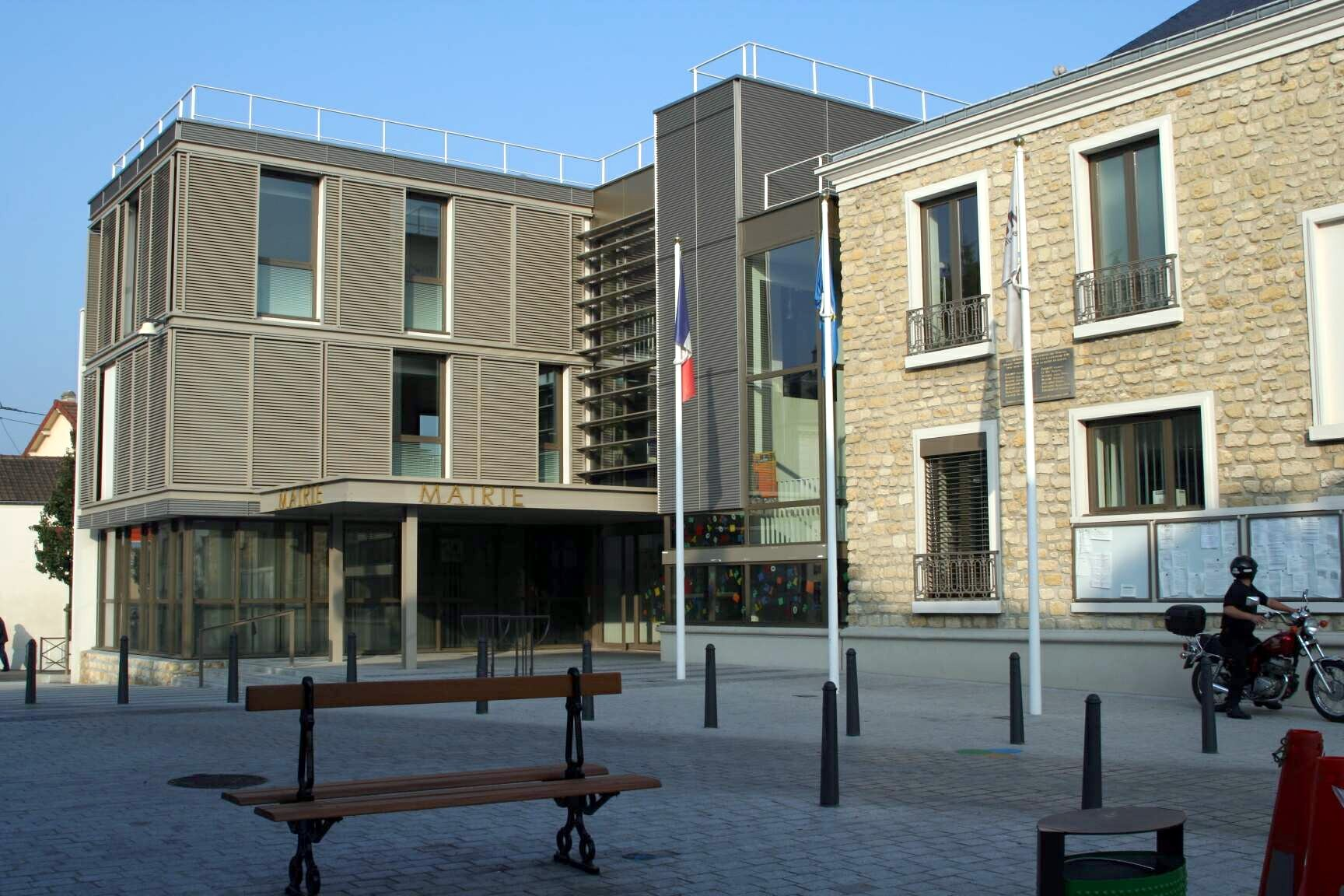
- The extension to the Hôtel de Ville in October 2006
- Interactive map of the Hôtel de Ville area

General information
- Type: City hall
- Architectural style: Modern style
- Location: Les Mureaux, France
- Coordinates: 48.9935°N 1.9092°E
- Completed: 1962

Design and construction
- Architect: André Bruyère

The Hôtel de Ville (French pronunciation: [otɛl də vil], City Hall) is a municipal building in Les Mureaux, Yvelines, in the northwestern suburbs of Paris, standing on Place de la Libération.

== History ==
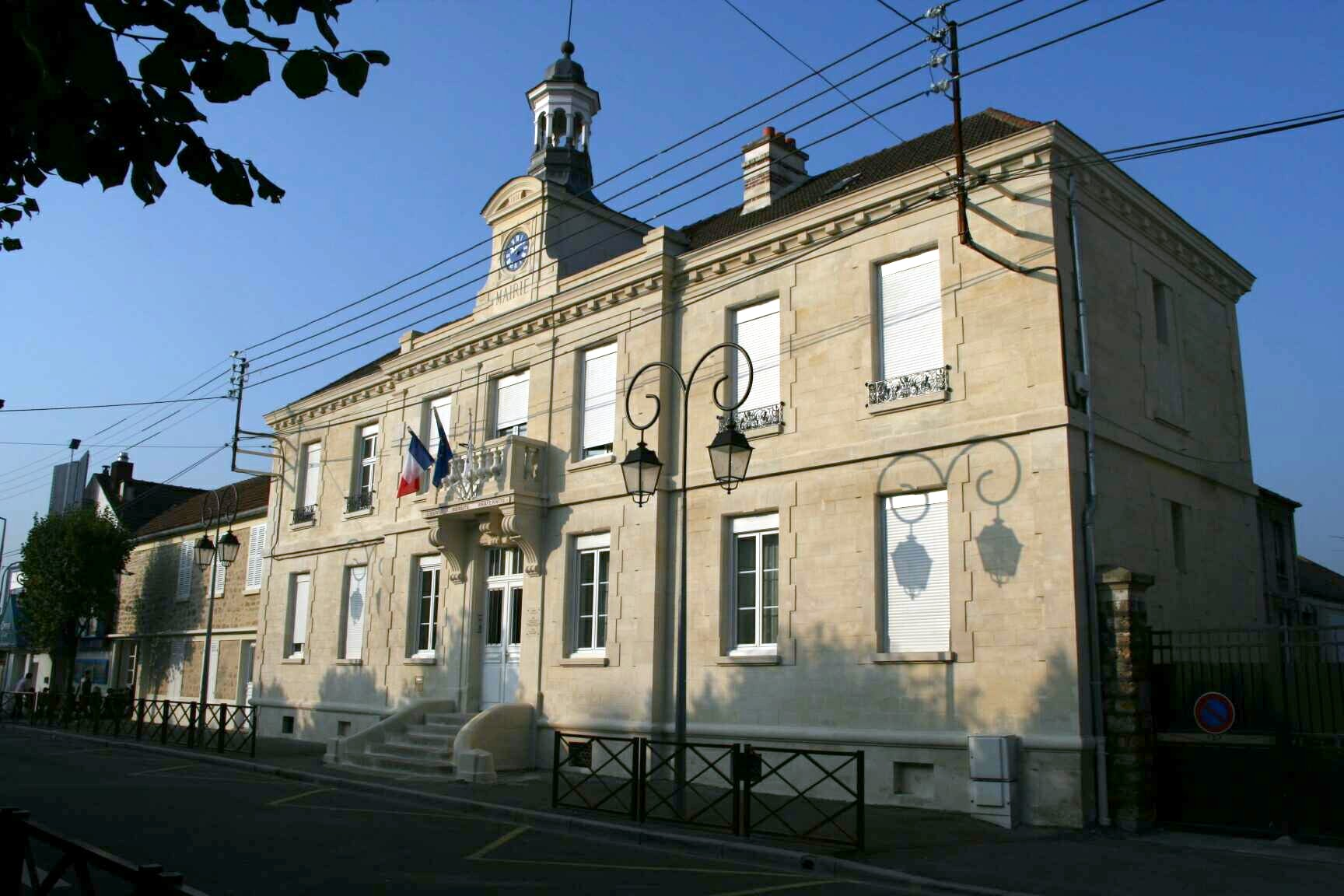
The first town hall

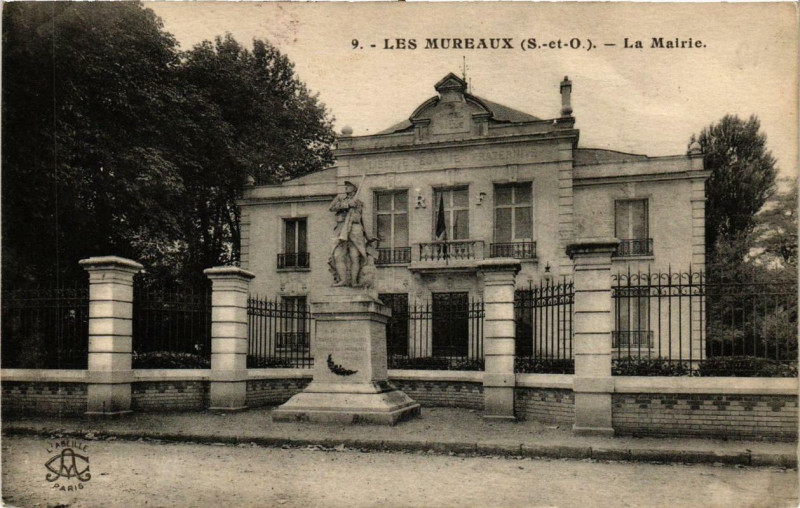
The second town hall

After the French Revolution, the town council initially met at the home of the mayor at the time. However, in the early 1870s, the council led by the mayor, Victor Alphonse Ravelet, decided to commission a dedicated town hall. The site they selected was on the west side of Avenue de la Gare (now Boulevard Victor Hugo). The building was designed in the neoclassical style, built in ashlar stone and was completed in 1874. After the implementation of the Jules Ferry laws in 1881, the building was extended for educational purposes.

The design involved a symmetrical main frontage of seven bays facing onto Avenue de la Gare. The central section of three bays was slightly projected forward. The central bay featured a short flight of steps leading up to a doorway on the ground floor, a French door with a balustraded balcony on the first floor, and a clock flanked by pilasters supporting a segmental pediment at roof level. Behind the clock, there was an octagonal belfry. The other bays were fenestrated by casement windows and, at roof level, there was a modillioned cornice. After the building was no longer required for municipal purposes it continued to serve as a school and was later designated the École Maternelle Henri Wallon.

In the early-1920s, following significant population growth, the council led by the mayor, Édouard Rouvel, decided to commission a new town hall. The site they selected was on the west side of Place de la Libération. The new building was designed in the neoclassical style, built in rubble masonry and was completed in 1925. The design involved a symmetrical main frontage of five bays facing onto the square with the central section of three bays slightly projected forward and enhanced by a higher parapet. There were three doorways on the ground floor and a French door with a balcony in the central bay on the first floor. The other bays were fenestrated with casement windows with iron railings.

A group of soldiers from the French Resistance seized the town hall on 19 August 1944, during the Second World War, just as a reconnaissance mission by American troops of the 79th Infantry Division entered the town. This was a week before the town was fully liberated on 26 August 1944.

The building was modernised and a new extension, with a reinforced concrete frame, was erected to a design by André Bruyère in 1962. In September 1992, a plaque was added to the south front of the building to commemorate the lives of 14 young citizens from the town who died in the September Massacres on 5 and 6 September 1792.

In the early 21st century, the council led by the mayor, François Garay, decided to refurbish the building. The work was carried out to a design by Jean-Luc Hesters and Marie-Sylvie Barlatier at a cost of €7.9 million and was completed in 2005. Following the improvements, the town hall became the first commercial building in France to achieve the Haute Qualité Environnementale (HQE) rating, a construction standard based on the principles of sustainable development. It incorporated a 300 kW heat pump which maintained temperatures in the building by accessing the water table below to supply heat to water pipes in the flooring. The roof was also modified to incorporate solar panels and a rainwater harvesting system to provide domestic hot water.
