= Canton of Les Mureaux =

Coordinates: 48.99°N 1.91°E

The canton of Les Mureaux is an administrative division of the Yvelines department, northern France. It was created at the French canton reorganisation which came into effect in March 2015. Its seat is in Les Mureaux.

It consists of the following communes:

1. Chapet
2. Ecquevilly
3. Évecquemont
4. Gaillon-sur-Montcient
5. Hardricourt
6. Meulan-en-Yvelines
7. Mézy-sur-Seine
8. Les Mureaux
9. Tessancourt-sur-Aubette
10. Vaux-sur-Seine
