= À la lanterne =

Slogan used during French Revolution

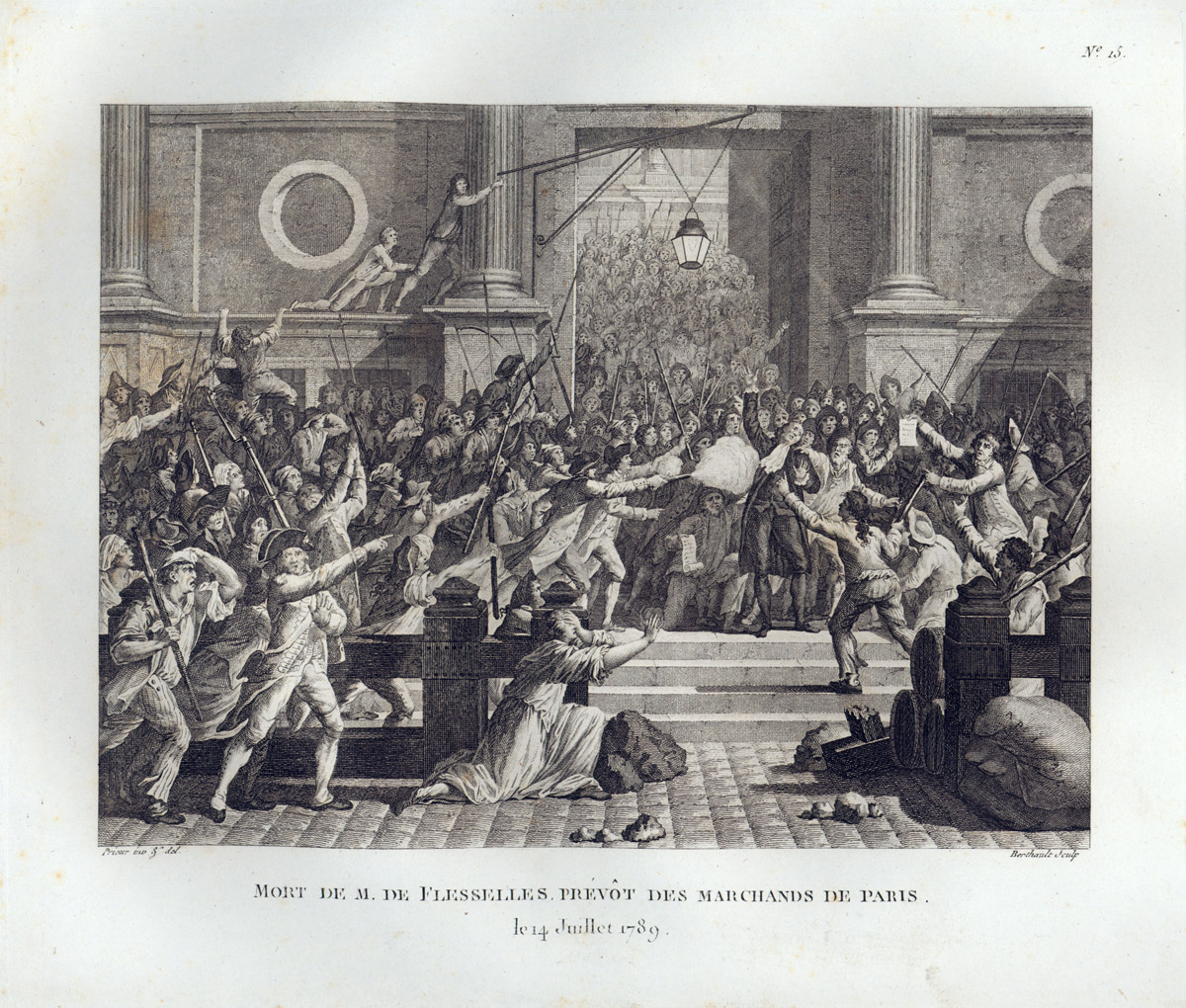
Jean-Louis Prieur, a painter of the French Revolution, portrayed the death of corrupt public servant Jacques de Flesselles, who was murdered on the steps before the Hôtel de Ville (Paris City Hall) on 14 July 1789, in an unusual way. Apart from other artists depicting the scene, he put a lamp post above the entrance to the Hôtel de Ville. According to Warren Roberts, the author of the book Jacques-Louis David and Jean-Louis Prieur, Revolutionary Artists: The Public, the Populace, and Images of the French Revolution, he pointed to the lantern as to a "symbol of revolutionary justice". An 1804 engraving by Pierre-Gabriel Berthault (after Jean-Louis Prieur).

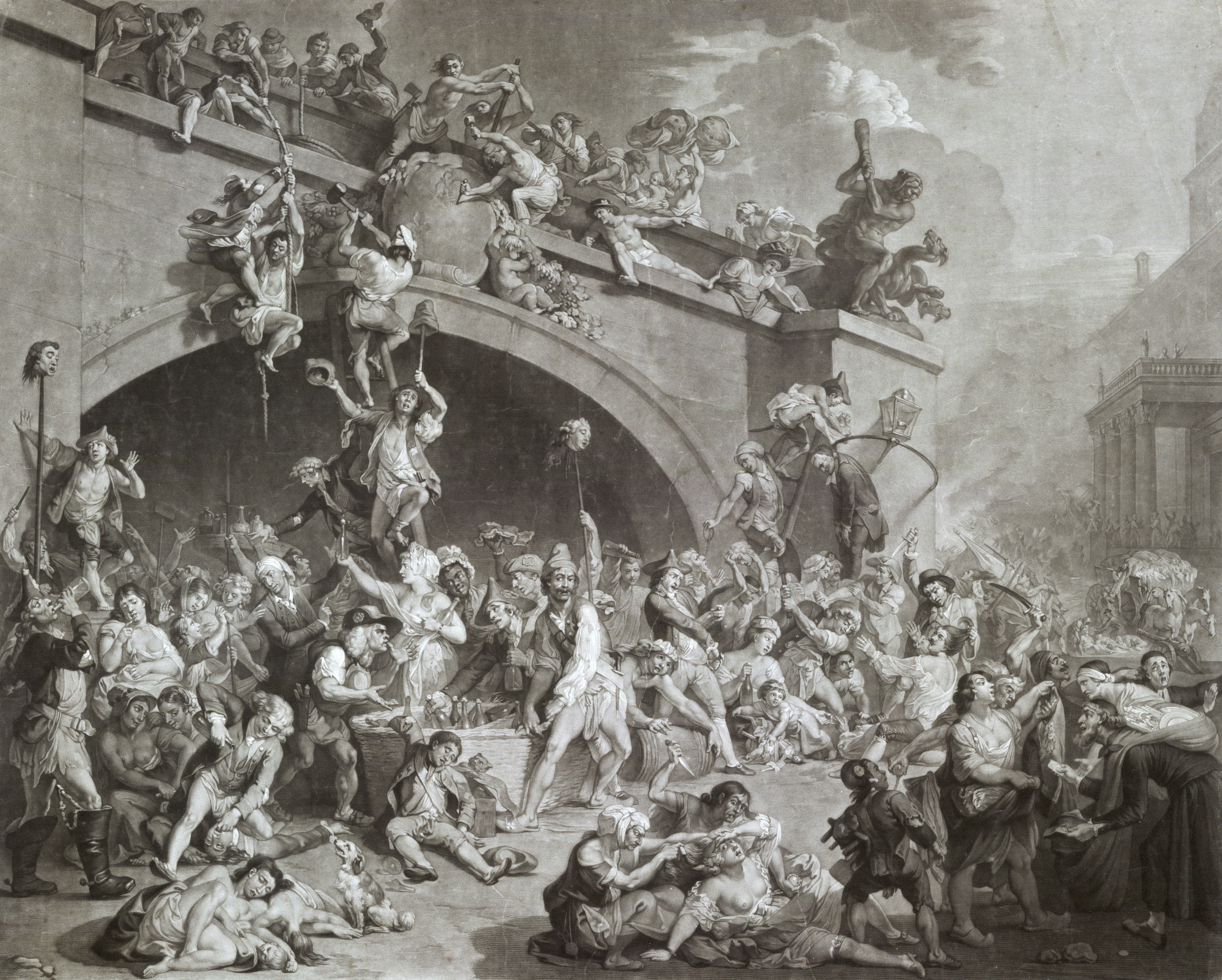
Two men hang a clergyman from a lamp; a scene from a mezzotint by Richard Earlom (The plundering of the King's cellar, Paris, 10 August 1793), see the middle-right.

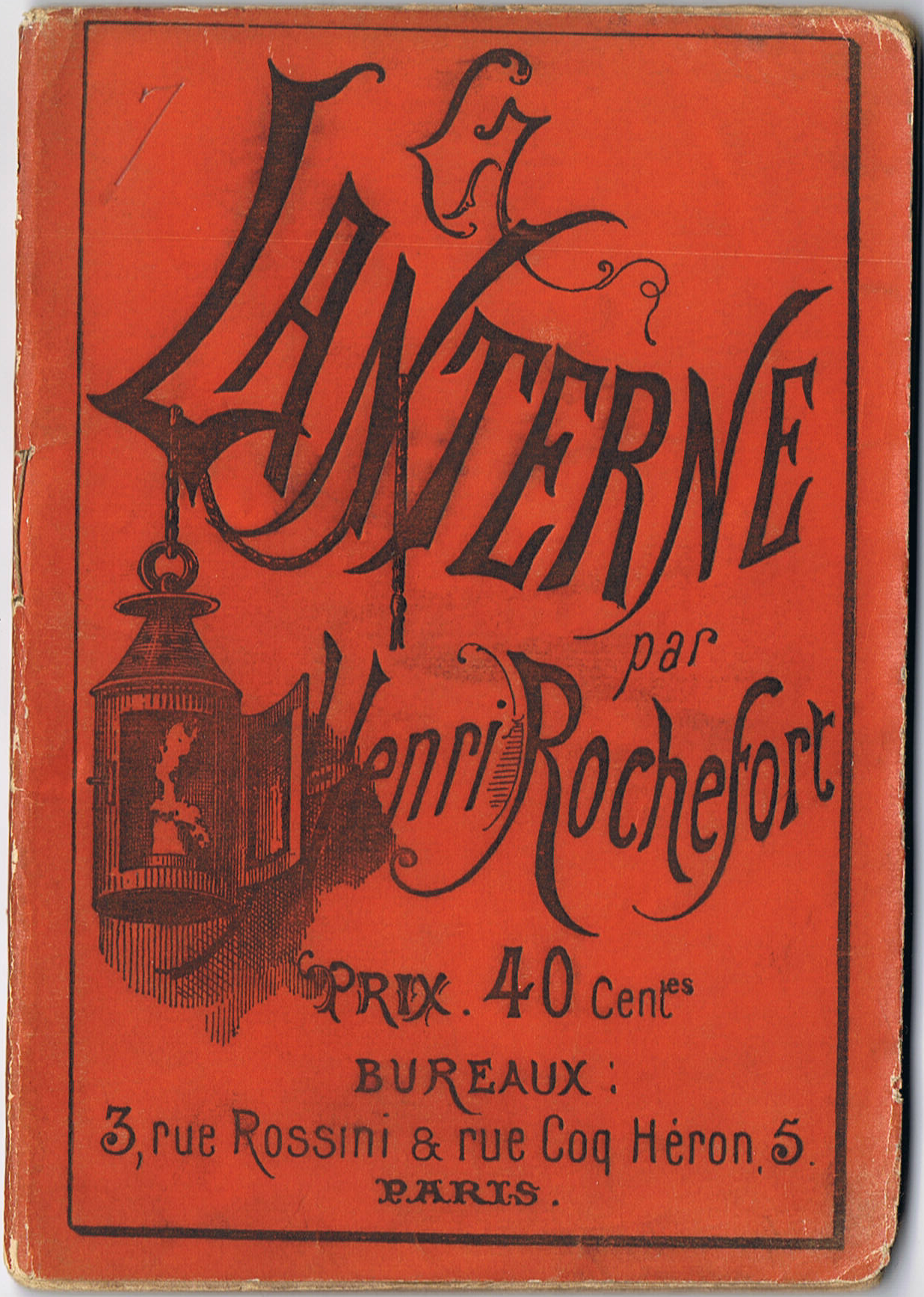
The provocative title of the controversial satirical journal La Lanterne published by Henri Rochefort from 1868 to 1876 might be inspired by the lamp posts used for lynching.

"À la lanterne!" (French pronunciation: [a la lɑ̃tɛʁn], lit. 'To the lamp post!') is a French slogan that gained special meaning and status in Paris and France during the early phase of the French Revolution from the summer of 1789. Lamp posts served as an instrument to mobs to perform extemporised lynchings and executions in the streets of Paris during the revolution when the people of Paris occasionally hanged officials and aristocrats from the lamp posts. Some English equivalents would be "String them up!" or "Hang 'em high!"

The lanterne became a symbol of popular or street justice in revolutionary France. The slogan "À la lanterne!" is referred to in such emblematic songs as Ça ira ("les aristocrates à la lanterne!" means "aristocrats to the lamp-post!" in this context). Journalist Camille Desmoulins, who had earlier practiced law, designated himself "The Lantern Attorney." He wrote a pamphlet entitled (in translation) "The Lamp Post Speaks to Parisians," in which "la lantèrne" tells the people, "I've always been here. You could have been using me all along!" As the revolutionary government became established, lamp posts were no longer needed as execution instruments, being replaced by the guillotine which became infamous in Paris during 1793–1794, though all major French cities had their own.

Hanging people from lamp posts ceased to be a part of Paris rebellions in the nineteenth century. Though the tradition continued in symbolic form up to the twentieth and twenty-first centuries, via the ritual hanging in effigy of unpopular political figures during street protests.

== History ==
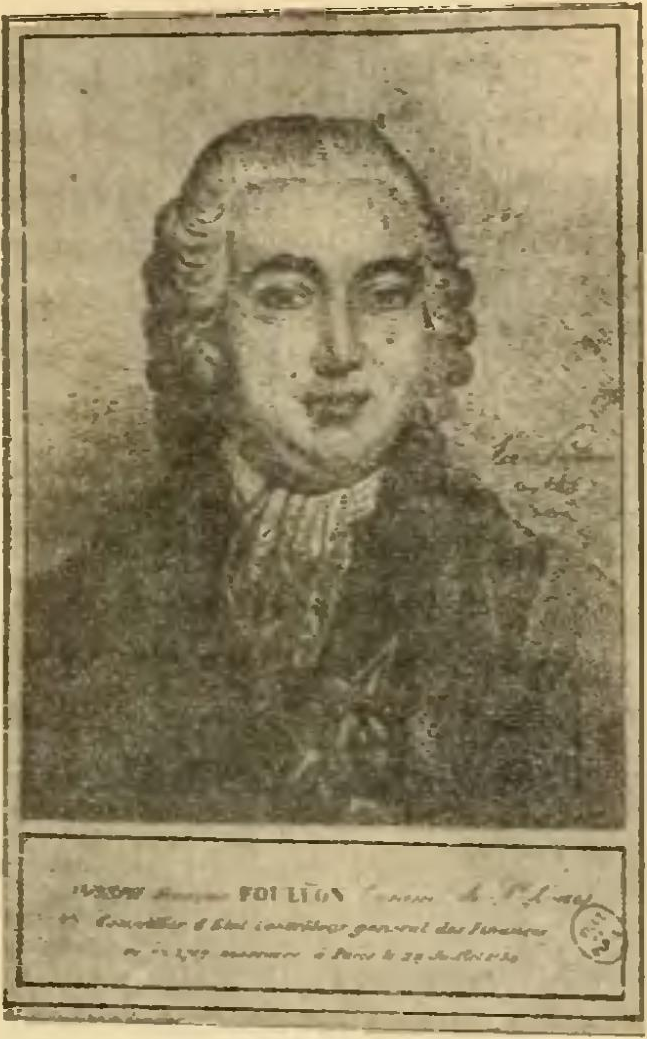
Joseph Foullon de Doué, the first victim of lynching "à la lanterne"

The first prominent victim of lynching "à la lanterne" was Joseph Foullon de Doué, a corrupt, unpopular politician who replaced Jacques Necker as a Controller-General of Finances in 1789. On 22 July 1789, the mob attempted to hang him on a lamp post, however, after the rope broke, he was beheaded and radicals marched with his head on a pike through the streets. "If [the people] are hungry, let them eat grass," he is said to have once proclaimed, although the claim is unsubstantiated. Because Foulon, an aristocrat administrator of the royal government, was in charge of the Paris markets. Foulon was known for his coldheartedness towards the needs of the common French people; he was suspected of controlling Paris' food supply and, thereby, keeping food prices unaffordable. So hated that he had even staged his own funeral to escape the people's wrath, the 74-year-old Foulon had spent years growing rich at his post while the poor starved. On 22 July 1789, he was captured by an angry Paris crowd, who stuffed Foulon's mouth with grass, then summarily hanged him from the boom of a lamp post at the Place de Grève, in front of the town hall (L'Hôtel de Ville). But the rope broke, and Foulon was hanged again and again before he was dropped to the ground and decapitated. His head, its mouth still full of grass, was placed on a pike—a long, sharpened, wooden pole—and paraded through the streets. Later that day Foulon's son-in-law, Louis Bénigne François Bertier de Sauvigny, was taken to the Place de Grève and hanged there, from the lamp post. De Sauvigny's severed head was placed on a pike of its own. Those bearing the pikes put the two severed heads together and chanted, "Kiss Daddy!"

Immediately following the storming of the Bastille on 14 July 1789 two of the invalids (veteran soldiers) forming part of the garrison of the fortress were hanged in the Place de Grève, although it is not recorded whether lanternes were used for the purpose.

Particularly the lamp post standing at the corner of the Place de Grève and the Rue de la Vannerie served as an improvised gallows. The reason for that was partly symbolic: the lantern was placed opposite the Hôtel de Ville (Paris City Hall), directly under the bust of Louis XIV, so that "popular justice could take place right under the eyes of the king".

In August 1789, journalist and politician Camille Desmoulins wrote his Discours à la lanterne, a defense of lynchings in the streets of Paris. Desmoulins was nicknamed Procureur-général de la lanterne (Attorney-General of the Lamp-post).

On 21 October 1789, a hungry Parisian mob dragged François the Baker (Denis François) out of his shop and hanged him from a lamp post, apparently because he had no bread to sell. Street lynching, instigated by various factors, gradually became an effective tool for the ends of the Jacobins.

On 14 December 1790, the crowd hanged barrister Pascalis and chevalier de La Rochette from a lamp post in Aix-en-Provence. The advocates of street justice cried "À la lanterne! À la lanterne!" shortly before the lynching.

On 20 June 1792, a mob broke into the Tuileries and threatened the queen Marie Antoinette. Her lady-in-waiting Jeanne-Louise-Henriette Campan reported that in the crowd "there was a model gallows, to which a dirty doll was suspended bearing the words "Marie-Antoinette a la lanterne" to represent her hanging".

== Influences ==
In 1919, Max Pechstein, a German expressionist painter, created a poster for the magazine An die Lanterne (À la lanterne). The poster depicts, among other things, a man hanging from a rope on a lamp post.
