= Tessancourt-sur-Aubette =

- Commune
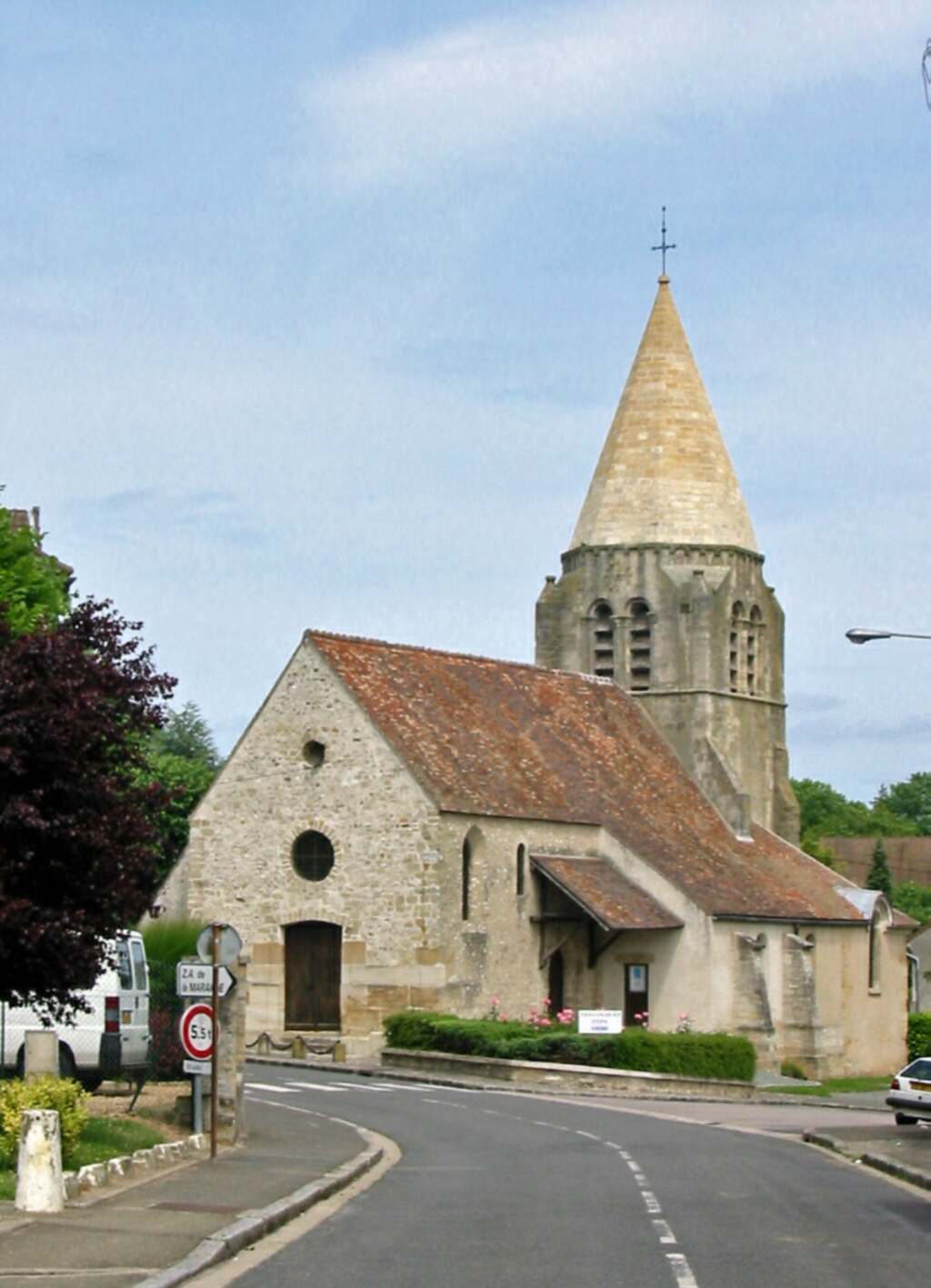
- The church in Tessancourt-sur-Aubette
- Location of Tessancourt-sur-Aubette
- Location within France Location within Île-de-France (region)
- Coordinates: 49°01′31″N 1°55′16″E
- Country: France
- Region: Île-de-France
- Department: Yvelines
- Arrondissement: Mantes-la-Jolie
- Canton: Les Mureaux
- Intercommunality: CU Grand Paris Seine et Oise

Government
  - Mayor (2020–2026): Paulette Favrou
- Area^{1}: 4.36 km^{2} (1.68 sq mi)
- Elevation: 74 m (243 ft)
- Highest elevation: 140 m (460 ft)
- Lowest elevation: 25 m (82 ft)
- Population (2023): 966
  - Density: 222/km^{2} (574/sq mi)
- Time zone: UTC+01:00 (CET)
  - Summer (DST): UTC+02:00 (CEST)
- INSEE/Postal code: 78609 /78250
- ^{1} French Land Register data, which excludes lakes, ponds, glaciers > 1 km^{2} (0.386 sq mi or 247 acres) and river estuaries.

Tessancourt-sur-Aubette (French pronunciation: [tɛsɑ̃kuʁ syʁ obɛt], literally Tessancourt on Aubette) is a commune in the Yvelines department in the Île-de-France region in north-central France.

== See also ==
- Communes of the Yvelines department
