= Évecquemont =

- Commune
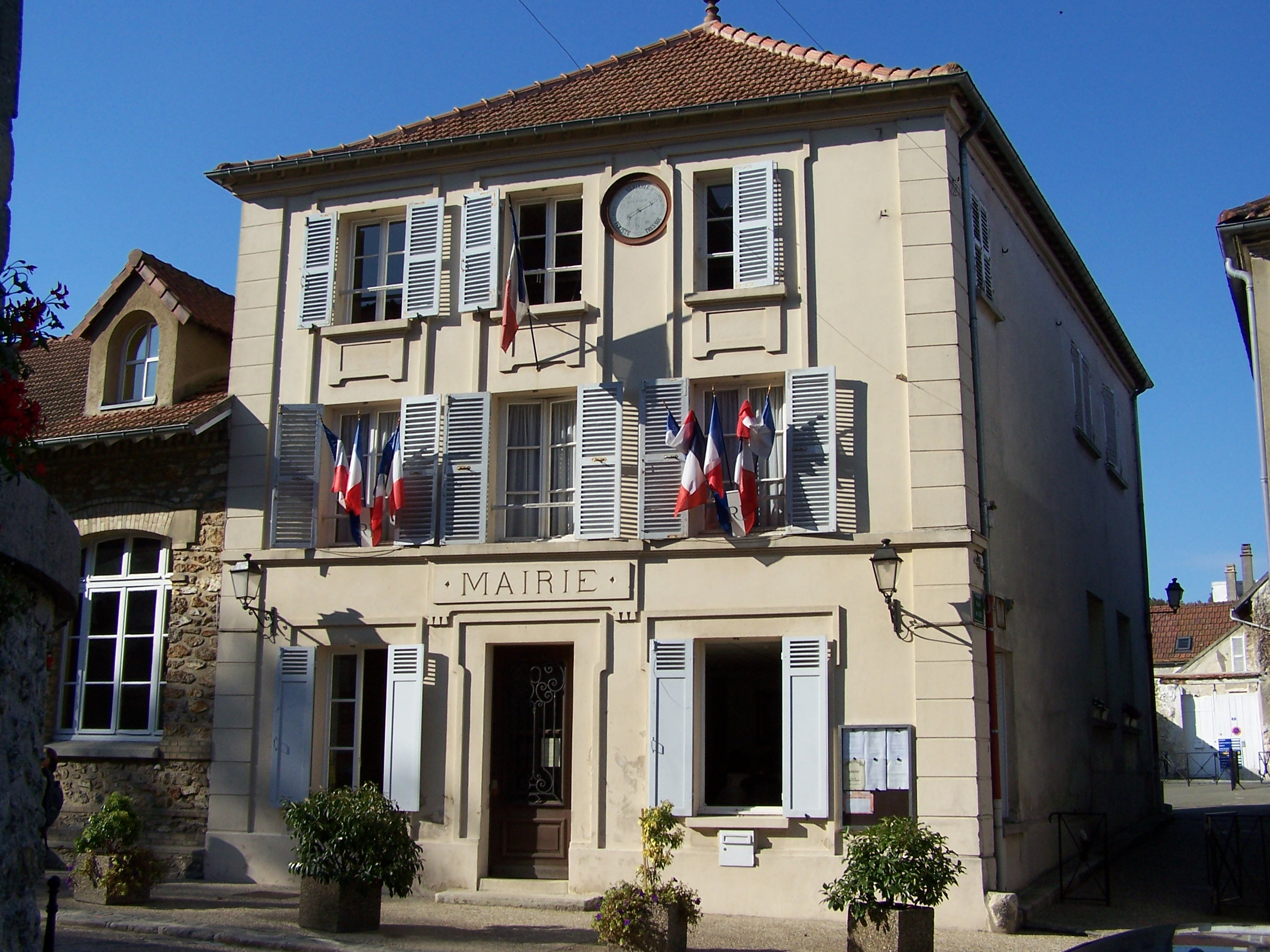
- Town hall
- Location of Évecquemont
- Location within France Location within Île-de-France (region)
- Coordinates: 49°00′53″N 1°56′43″E
- Country: France
- Region: Île-de-France
- Department: Yvelines
- Arrondissement: Mantes-la-Jolie
- Canton: Les Mureaux
- Intercommunality: CU Grand Paris Seine et Oise

Government
  - Mayor (2020–2026): Christophe Nicolas
- Area^{1}: 2.50 km^{2} (0.97 sq mi)
- Elevation: 140 m (460 ft)
- Highest elevation: 172 m (564 ft)
- Lowest elevation: 57 m (187 ft)
- Population (2023): 754
  - Density: 302/km^{2} (781/sq mi)
- Time zone: UTC+01:00 (CET)
  - Summer (DST): UTC+02:00 (CEST)
- INSEE/Postal code: 78227 /78740
- ^{1} French Land Register data, which excludes lakes, ponds, glaciers > 1 km^{2} (0.386 sq mi or 247 acres) and river estuaries.

Évecquemont (French pronunciation: [evɛkmɔ̃]) is a commune in the Yvelines department in the Île-de-France in north-central France.

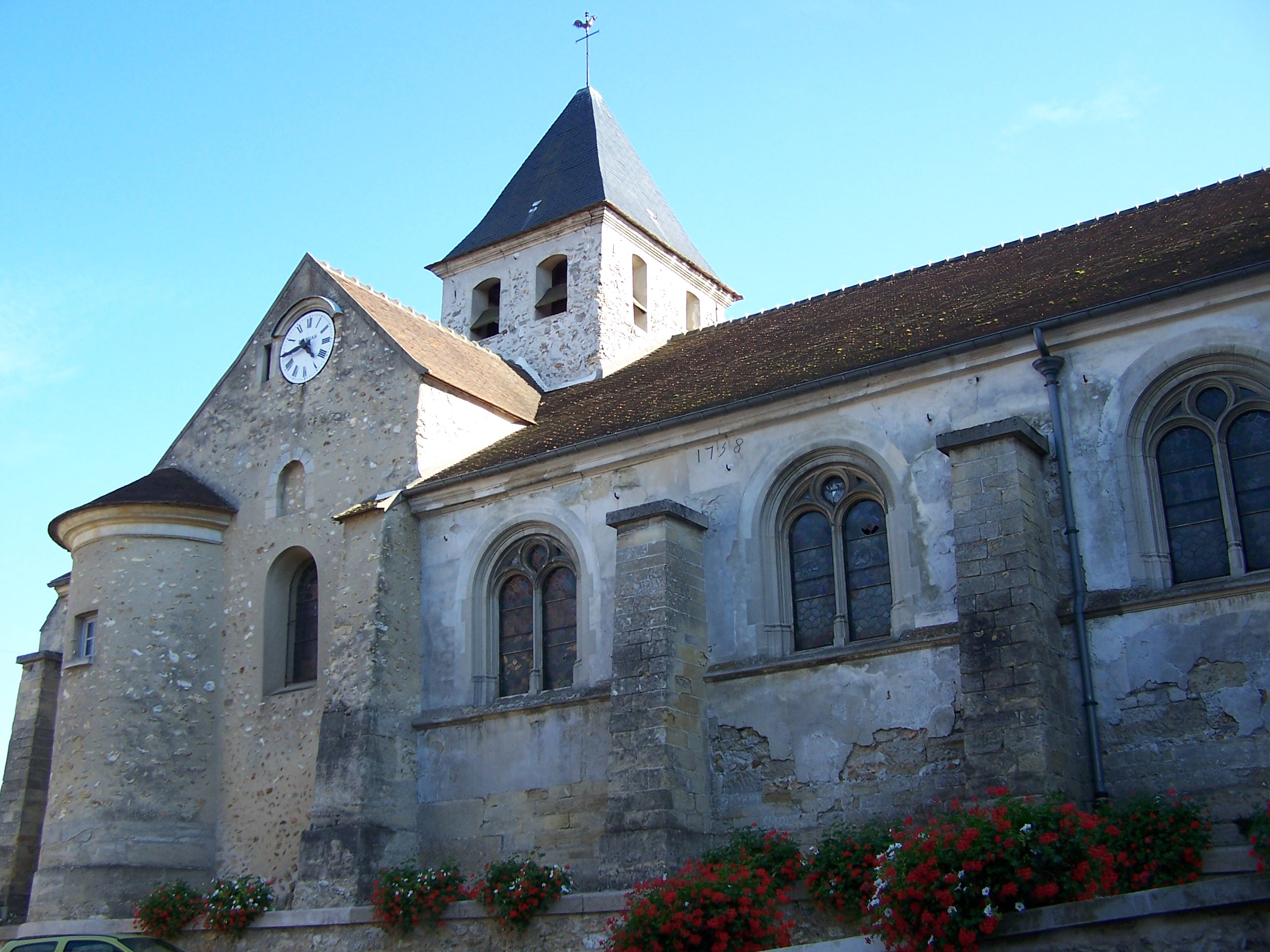
Our Lady of the Assumption's Church

== Notable people ==
- Jeanine Delpech (1905-1992), French journalist, translator, novelist

== See also ==
- Communes of the Yvelines department
