= Jeanine Delpech =

French journalist & translator (1905–1992)

- Born: Jeanine Louise Nelly Delpech; 1 August 1905
- Died: 3 July 1992 (aged 86)
- Education: Faculty of Paris (1935)
- Occupations: journalist; translator; author
- Spouses: Antoine Goldet (m. 1925, divorced); Robert Tessier (m. 1937)
- Children: 2
- Writing career
- Pen name: Jean de Lutry; Robert Beauchamp
- Language: French; English
- Genres: romance novels; detective novels; sentimental novels; historical works
- Notable work: L’Âme de la Fronde : Madame de Longueville
- Notable awards: Prix Alice-Louis-Barthou

Jeanine Delpech (born Jeanine Louise Nelly Delpech; 1 August 1905 – 3 July 1992) was a French journalist and translator from English, as well as an author of romance novels, detective novels, sentimental novels, and historical works. Her works appeared under various names including Jean de Lutry, Robert Beauchamp, Jeanine Goldet, Jeanine Antoine-Goldet, Louise Nelly Delpech-Teissier and Madame Robert Teissier. Delpech died in 1992.

== Early life and education ==
Jeanine Louise Nelly Delpech was born in 1905 at the Château du Prieuré in Évecquemont, to Edmond Jean Frédéric Marie Delpech, a lawyer, and Françoise Marie Reine Suzanne Estier, his wife.

In 1935, she received a Bachelor of Arts degree in literature from the Faculty of Paris.

== Career ==
She began her literary career by publishing numerous historical works, including several on criminal cases or famous criminals. She also provided a few romance novels to various publishers, including Groupe Flammarion, sometimes using the pseudonym, "Jean de Lutry". She collaborated for many years with the literary and artistic journal, Les Nouvelles littéraires, as well as with other cultural publications. Under the pseudonym of "Robert Beauchamp", she published half a dozen detective novels in the 1960s by the Presses de la Cité and, in the 1970s, in the Le Masque collection. As a translator, she was the author of the French language texts of the novel, Eh bien, ma jolie, by James Hadley Chase, Les Lévriers du seraglio by Mary Stewart, and the biographical account of Ernest Hemingway entitled, Les Vertes Collines d'Afrique. In addition to using various masculine pen names, including "Jean de Lutry" and "Robert Beauchamp" After her marriage to Antoine Goldet, she signed some of her texts "Jeanine Goldet" or "Jeanine Antoine-Goldet". Having married Robert Tessier, she signed her works, "Louise Nelly Delpech-Teissie" or "Madame Robert Teissier".

== Personal life ==
In 1925, she became engaged to Antoine Goldet, then a student at the École Normale Supérieure. Their daughter, Nicole, was born the following year, and their son, François, in 1929. After a divorce, Jeanine remarried in 1937 with Robert Tessier.

She died 3 July 1992, in the 7th arrondissement of Paris.

== Awards ==
- 1958, Prix Alice-Louis-Barthou, from the Académie Française, for L’Âme de la Fronde : Madame de Longueville (1957)

== Selected works ==
=== Novels ===
==== Romance novels ====
- Les Noces de minuit, 1955
- Le Serpent d’émeraude, 1957

==== Romance novels by Jean de Lutry ====
- Cendrillon à Hollywood, 1951
- Les Fiancés de Venise, 1957
- La Violette et l’Orchidée, 1958

==== Detective novels by Robert Beauchamp ====
- Flagrant Délire, 1961
- Les Nymphes d’Auteuil, 1962
- Six x = zéro, 1971
- L’Héritière malgré elle, 1971
- Des nuits trop blanches, 1973

==== Historical novels ====
- Isaline, 1971

==== Other novels ====
- Les Liens de fumée, 1947
- Une nuit pour le diable, 1960

=== Historical works ===
- La Double Mary, reine des voleurs au temps de Shakespeare, 1943
- Louise de Kéroualle, 1949
- L’Âme de la Fronde : Madame de Longueville, 1957
- L’Amour le plus tendre : Le Chevalier de Boufflers et Mme de Sabran, 1964
- La Passion de la Marquise de Sade, 1970
- Gentleman jusqu’au crime, 1972
- La Demoiselle à l’arsenic, 1973

=== Translations from English to French ===
- Eh bien, ma jolie, by James Hadley Chase
- Les Lévriers du seraglio, by Mary Stewart
- Les Vertes Collines d'Afrique, biographical account of Ernest Hemingway
