= Ecquevilly =

- Commune
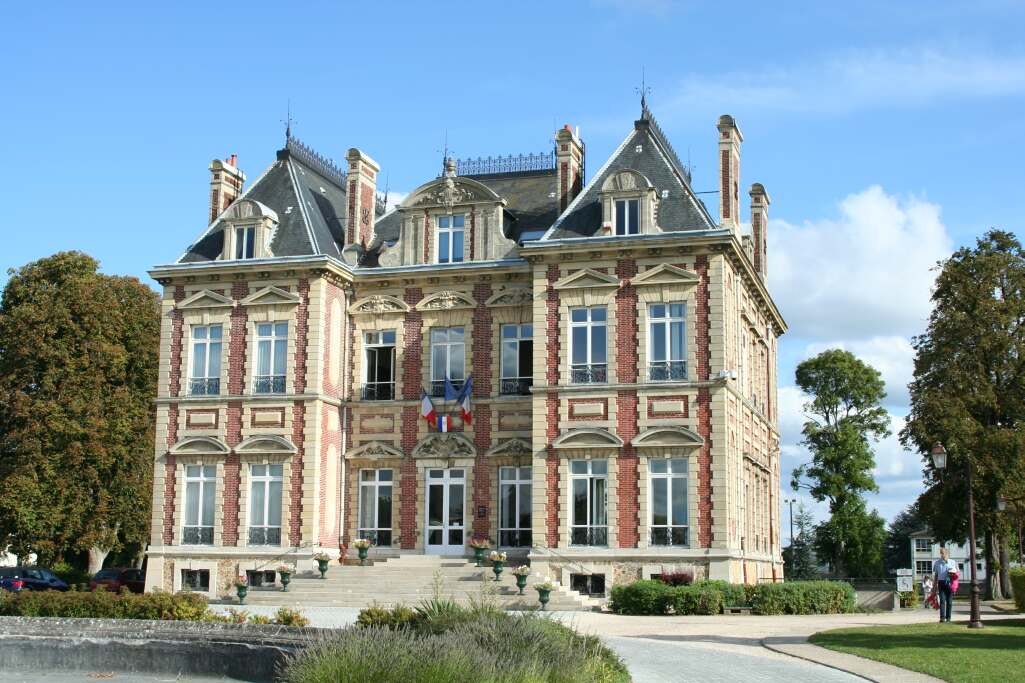
- Town hall

- Coat of arms
- Location of Ecquevilly
- Location within France Location within Île-de-France (region)
- Coordinates: 48°57′03″N 1°55′20″E
- Country: France
- Region: Île-de-France
- Department: Yvelines
- Arrondissement: Mantes-la-Jolie
- Canton: Les Mureaux
- Intercommunality: CU Grand Paris Seine et Oise

Government
  - Mayor (2020–2026): Marc Herz
- Area^{1}: 11.27 km^{2} (4.35 sq mi)
- Elevation: 83 m (272 ft)
- Highest elevation: 181 m (594 ft)
- Lowest elevation: 33 m (108 ft)
- Population (2023): 4,279
  - Density: 379.7/km^{2} (983.4/sq mi)
- Time zone: UTC+01:00 (CET)
  - Summer (DST): UTC+02:00 (CEST)
- INSEE/Postal code: 78206 /78920
- ^{1} French Land Register data, which excludes lakes, ponds, glaciers > 1 km^{2} (0.386 sq mi or 247 acres) and river estuaries.

Ecquevilly (French pronunciation: [ɛkviji]) is a commune in the Yvelines department in the Île-de-France in north-central France.

== Population ==
Historical population
Year	Pop.	±% p.a.
1968	2,822	—
1975	3,442	+2.88%
1982	3,600	+0.64%
1990	3,794	+0.66%
1999	4,208	+1.16%
2007	4,253	+0.13%
2012	3,987	−1.28%
2017	4,259	+1.33%
2023	4,279	+0.08%
Source: INSEE

== See also ==
- Communes of the Yvelines department
