= Joseph Foullon de Doué =

18th-century French politician

Joseph-François Foullon
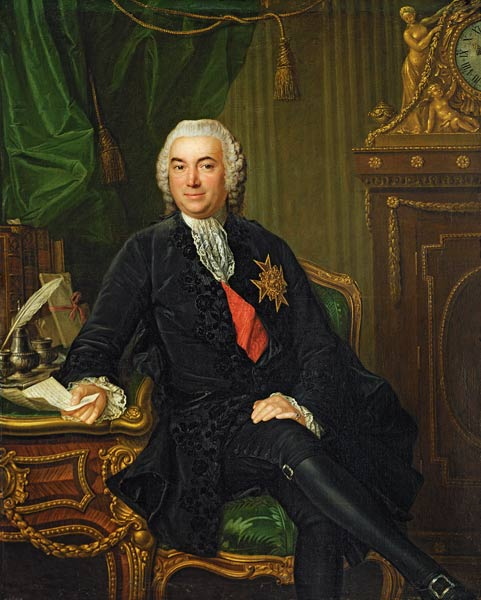

Controller-General of Finances
- In office 13 July 1789 – 16 July 1789
- Monarch: Louis XVI
- Preceded by: Jacques Necker (25 August 1788 – 11 July 1789)
- Succeeded by: Jacques Necker (16 July 1789 (confirmed in writing on 23 July by letter from Basel) – 3 September 1790)

Personal details
- Born: 25 June 1715 Saumur, France
- Died: 22 July 1789 (aged 74) Place de Grève, Paris, France

Joseph-François Foullon de Doué (25 June 1715 – 22 July 1789) was a French politician and a Controller-General of Finances under Louis XVI.

A deeply unpopular figure during the French Revolution, he was supposed to be lynched à la lanterne on 22 July. However, since the ropes used for hanging broke several times, he was eventually beheaded by an angry mob, who then impaled his head on a pike and paraded it through the streets of Paris with a tuft of hay in his mouth. At the same time, his son-in-law – the Intendant of Paris, Louis Bénigne François Bertier de Sauvigny – died by hanging from a street lamp.

== Offices ==
Born in Saumur, Maine-et-Loire, Foullon served as Intendant-General of the Armies during the Seven Years' War, and as Intendant of the Army and Navy under Marshal de Belle-Isle. In 1771 he was appointed Intendant of Finances. In 1789, when Jacques Necker was dismissed, the reactionary Court party nominated Foullon as Controller-General of Finances and minister of the king's household in the new government.

Foullon became unpopular on all sides. The farmers-general resented his severity, and the Parisians his wealth, viewed as resulting from the exploitation of the poor. An unsubstantiated rumor accused him of having said during an earlier famine: "If those rascals have no bread, then let them eat hay". A staunch conservative, he also was very hostile to Louis Philippe d'Orléans' circle.

Foullon was a member of the Parlement of Paris immediately prior to the French Revolution, nicknamed Ame damnée ("damned soul").

== Refuge and murder ==
After the storming of the Bastille on 14 July, Foullon fled from Paris to his friend Antoine de Sartine's house at Viry-Châtillon, a few miles south of the capital. Aware of the feeling against him Foullon had reports of his own death circulated.

On 22 July Foullon was captured by the peasants on Sartine's estate, and taken to the Hôtel de Ville. Made to walk barefoot, he had a bundle of hay tied to his back, was given peppered vinegar to drink, and had the sweat on his face wiped off with nettles.

In Paris Jean Sylvain Bailly and the Marquis de La Fayette tried to intervene but Foullon was dragged by the populace to the Place de Grève. As he was hanged from a lamp-post, the rope broke three times in a row – so members of the crowd decided to behead him instead, before parading his head on a pike with his mouth stuffed with grass, hay and excrement.

Foullon's son-in-law Bertier de Sauvigny, the intendant of Paris was confronted by the severed head before being lynched himself. The nature of the killing of both Foullon and Bertier was endorsed by Antoine Barnave, a member of the new National Legislative Assembly, with the comment: "What, then, is their blood so pure?".

Foullon's killing is mentioned in Charles Dickens' A Tale of Two Cities. It is also discussed in Thomas Paine's Rights of Man (1791), in which Paine likens Foullon's ordeal to that of Robert-François Damiens, executed in 1757 following an attempted regicide, in order to argue that the Reign of Terror was the result of behaviour learned from the rulers of the Ancien Régime.
