= Gadancourt =

- Part of Avernes
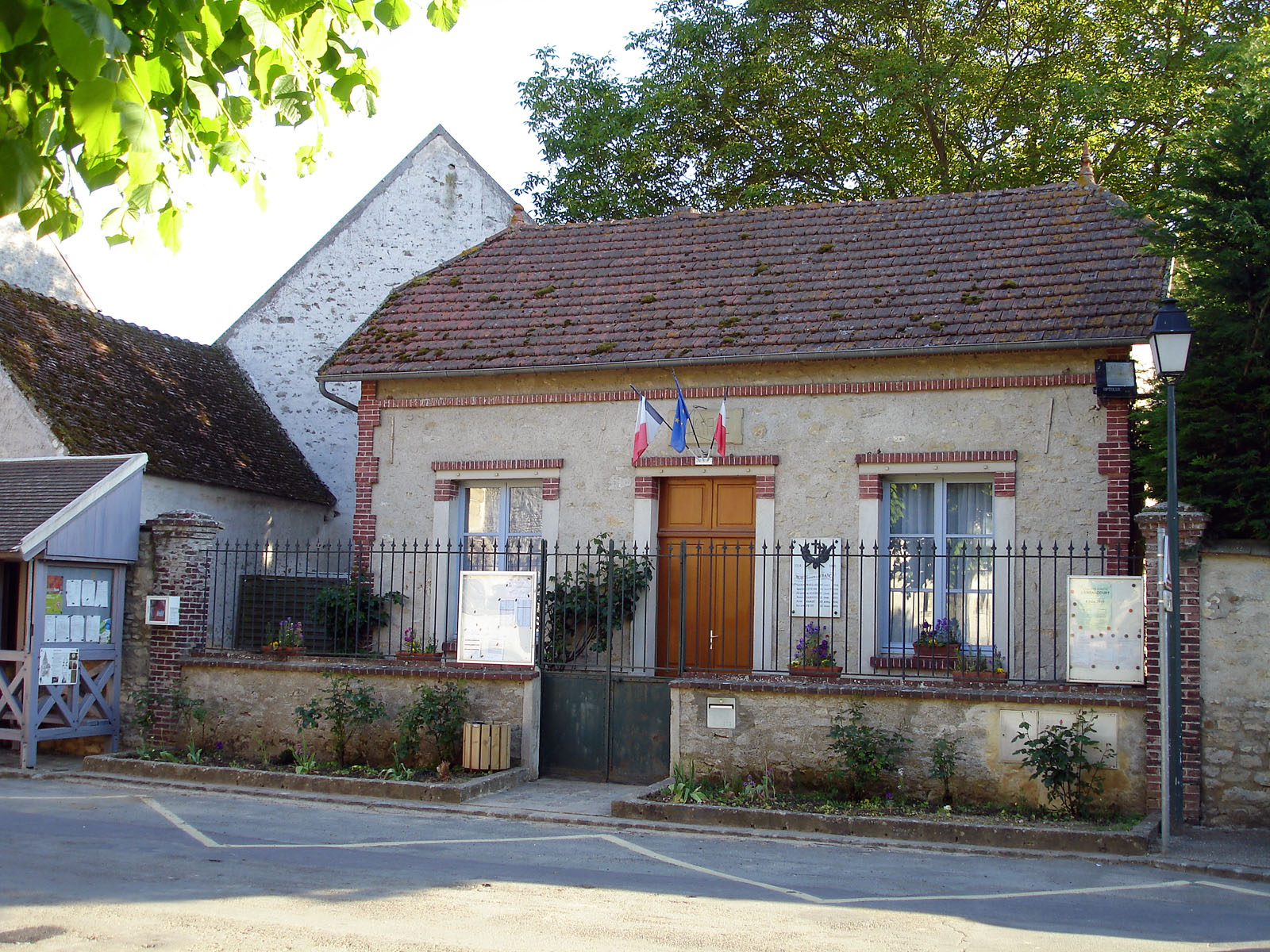
- The town hall of Gadancourt

- Coat of arms
- Location of Gadancourt
- Location within France Location within Île-de-France (region)
- Coordinates: 49°05′49″N 1°51′28″E
- Country: France
- Region: Île-de-France
- Department: Val-d'Oise
- Arrondissement: Pontoise
- Canton: Vauréal
- Commune: Avernes
- Area^{1}: 4.68 km^{2} (1.81 sq mi)
- Highest elevation: 141 m (463 ft)
- Lowest elevation: 87 m (285 ft)
- Population (2015): 83
  - Density: 18/km^{2} (46/sq mi)
- Time zone: UTC+01:00 (CET)
  - Summer (DST): UTC+02:00 (CEST)
- Postal code: 95450
- ^{1} French Land Register data, which excludes lakes, ponds, glaciers > 1 km^{2} (0.386 sq mi or 247 acres) and river estuaries.

Gadancourt (French pronunciation: [ɡadɑ̃kuʁ]) is a former commune in the Val-d'Oise department in Île-de-France in northern France. On 1 January 2018, it was merged into the commune of Avernes.

== See also ==
- Communes of the Val-d'Oise department
