= Les Mureaux =

- Commune
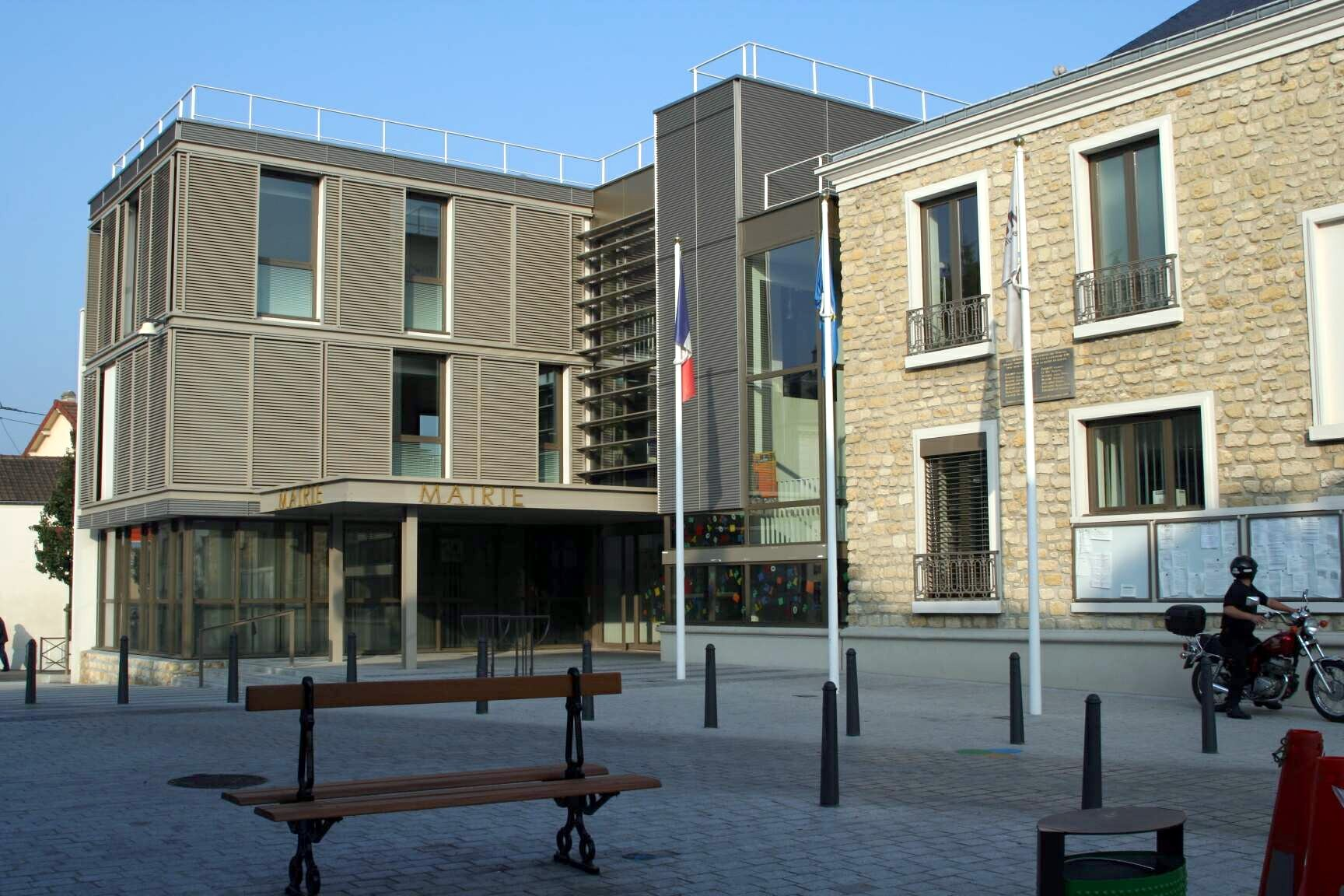
- The Hôtel de Ville

- Coat of arms

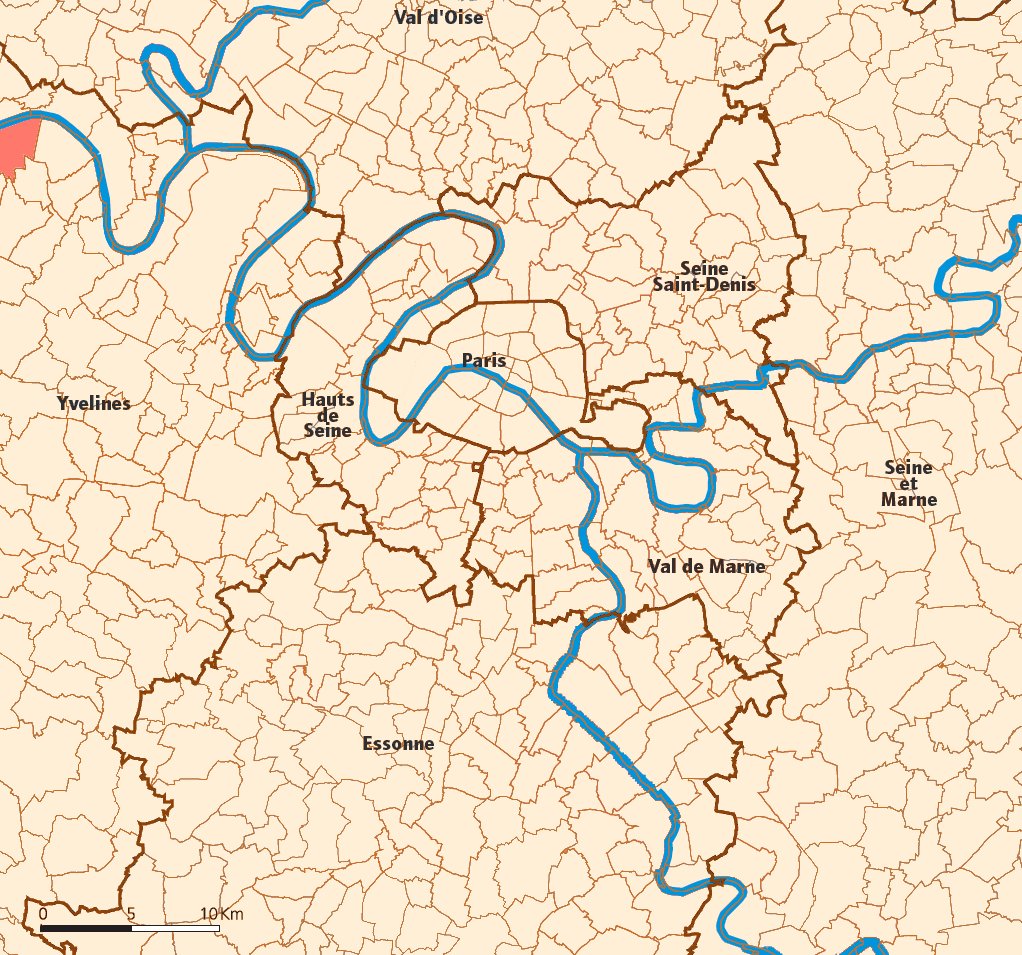
- Location (in red) within Paris inner and outer suburbs
- Location of Les Mureaux
- Location within France Location within Île-de-France (region)
- Coordinates: 48°59′15″N 1°55′02″E
- Country: France
- Region: Île-de-France
- Department: Yvelines
- Arrondissement: Mantes-la-Jolie
- Canton: Les Mureaux
- Intercommunality: CU Grand Paris Seine et Oise

Government
  - Mayor (2026–2032): Damien Vignier
- Area^{1}: 11.99 km^{2} (4.63 sq mi)
- Highest elevation: 53 m (174 ft)
- Lowest elevation: 18 m (59 ft)
- Population (2023): 34,632
  - Density: 2,888/km^{2} (7,481/sq mi)
- Time zone: UTC+01:00 (CET)
  - Summer (DST): UTC+02:00 (CEST)
- INSEE/Postal code: 78440 /78130
- ^{1} French Land Register data, which excludes lakes, ponds, glaciers > 1 km^{2} (0.386 sq mi or 247 acres) and river estuaries.

Les Mureaux (French pronunciation: [le myʁo]) is a commune in the Yvelines department in the Île-de-France region in north-central France. It is located in the north-western suburbs of Paris, 35.9 km (22.3 mi) from the centre of Paris.

== History ==
The Hôtel de Ville was completed in 1962.

== Population ==
Historical population

Year	Pop.	±% p.a.
1793	745	—
1800	752	+0.13%
1806	781	+0.63%
1821	813	+0.27%
1831	783	−0.38%
1836	720	−1.66%
1841	774	+1.46%
1846	827	+1.33%
1851	794	−0.81%
1856	885	+2.19%
1861	983	+2.12%
1866	1,113	+2.52%
1872	1,230	+1.68%
1876	1,394	+3.18%
1881	1,740	+4.53%
1886	2,006	+2.89%
1891	2,070	+0.63%
1896	2,214	+1.35%
1901	2,285	+0.63%

Year	Pop.	±% p.a.
1906	2,234	−0.45%
1911	2,485	+2.15%
1921	2,896	+1.54%
1926	3,540	+4.10%
1931	4,605	+5.40%
1936	5,048	+1.85%
1946	5,427	+0.73%
1954	8,218	+5.32%
1962	19,016	+11.06%
1968	21,733	+2.25%
1975	28,165	+3.77%
1982	31,619	+1.67%
1990	33,089	+0.57%
1999	31,739	−0.46%
2007	32,911	+0.45%
2012	30,760	−1.34%
2017	32,792	+1.29%
2023	34,632	+0.91%

Source: EHESS and INSEE (1968-2023)

== Transport ==
Les Mureaux is served by Les Mureaux station on the Transilien Paris-Saint-Lazare suburban rail line.

== Education ==
There are eleven preschools, eleven elementary schools, three junior high schools, and two senior high schools/sixth form colleges in Les Mureaux.

Junior high schools:

- Collège Paul-Verlaine
- Collège Jules-Verne
- Collège Jean-Vilar

Senior high schools/sixth form colleges:

- Lycée professionnel et technologique Jacques-Vaucanson
- Lycée général et technologique François-Villon

== International relations ==
Les Mureaux is twinned with:

- Idar-Oberstein, Germany
- Margate, United Kingdom
- Nonantola, Italy
- Sosnowiec, Poland

== See also ==
- Communes of the Yvelines department
