= Avernes =

- Commune
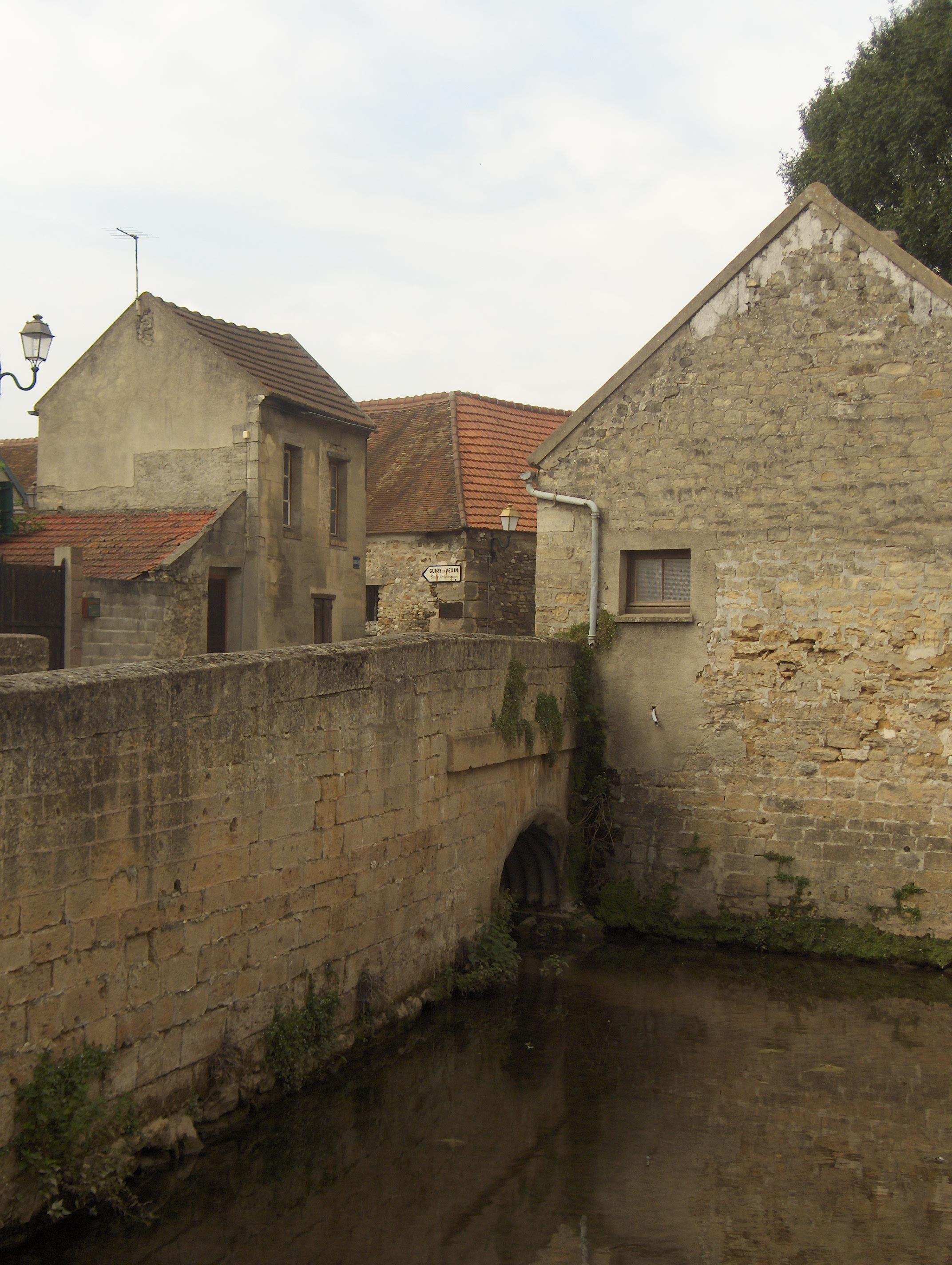
- L'Aubette de Meulan River

- Coat of arms
- Location of Avernes
- Location within France Location within Île-de-France (region)
- Coordinates: 49°05′11″N 1°52′27″E
- Country: France
- Region: Île-de-France
- Department: Val-d'Oise
- Arrondissement: Pontoise
- Canton: Vauréal
- Intercommunality: CC Vexin Centre

Government
  - Mayor (2020–2026): Chrystelle Noblia
- Area^{1}: 17.15 km^{2} (6.62 sq mi)
- Highest elevation: 201 m (659 ft)
- Lowest elevation: 82 m (269 ft)
- Population (2023): 871
  - Density: 50.8/km^{2} (132/sq mi)
- Time zone: UTC+01:00 (CET)
  - Summer (DST): UTC+02:00 (CEST)
- INSEE/Postal code: 95040 /95450
- ^{1} French Land Register data, which excludes lakes, ponds, glaciers > 1 km^{2} (0.386 sq mi or 247 acres) and river estuaries.

Avernes (French pronunciation: [avɛʁn]) is a commune in the Val-d'Oise department in Île-de-France in northern France. On 1 January 2018, the former commune of Gadancourt was merged into Avernes.

== Population ==
Population data refer to the area corresponding with the commune as of January 2025.

Historical population
Year	Pop.	±% p.a.
1968	575	—
1975	655	+1.88%
1982	761	+2.17%
1990	765	+0.07%
1999	852	+1.20%
2007	921	+0.98%
2012	909	−0.26%
2017	852	−1.29%
2023	871	+0.37%
Source: INSEE

== See also ==
- Communes of the Val-d'Oise department
