= Louis Bénigne François Bertier de Sauvigny =

French public servant (1737-1789)

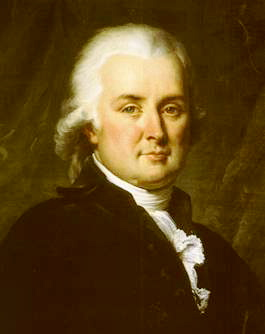
Portrait.

Louis Bénigne François Bertier de Sauvigny (1737–1789) was a French public servant under the monarchy. He held the position of intendant of Paris from 13 September 1776 onwards. An energetic official he undertook extensive reforms of the city's taxation system, introducing calculations on the basis of arable land ownership.

By the time the French Revolution broke out in July 1789, Bertier de Sauvigny was already unpopular, as part of his duties involved the obtaining of provisions for the Royal army. During the period of widespread disturbances that preceded and followed the storming of the Bastille on 14 July, rumors were circulated accusing Bertier de Sauvigny of responsibility for food shortages in Paris at the time,

On 22 July 1789, Bertier de Sauvigny was in residence at his country house in Compiegne. An armed party brought him to Paris in a cabriolet (two wheeled carriage), to answer charges of actions aimed at starving the Third Estate. Outside the city a crowd of demonstrators intercepted the group and tore off the roof of the vehicle. The intendent was beaten and stoned before being taken to the Porte Saint-Martin. There he was confronted with the severed head of his father-in-law Joseph Foullon de Doué, a member of the Parlement of Paris. Bertier de Sauvigny was then hanged from a lamp post in front of the Hôtel de Ville.

The ferocity of the lynching of Foullon and Bertier led to protests to which Antoine Barnave, a member of the new National Assembly, responded: "What, then, is their blood so pure?"

Pierre de Coubertin was his great-great-grandson.
