= Intendant (Kingdom of France) =

Royal administrative officials ruling généralités

- Intendant de police, justice & finances
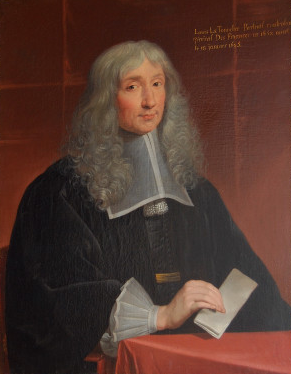
- Louis Le Tonnelier de Breteuil, intendant of Languedoc (1647–1653) and the généralité of Paris (1653–1657)
- Appointer: King of France
- Term length: Non-fixed
- Formation: 1635
- Abolished: 1790
- Salary: ~10,000 pounds

Under the Ancien régime, intendants were pivotal figures in the royal administration of France, operating within the généralités. Their role was somewhat analogous to modern prefects, though with less extensive authority.

== Administrative structure ==
Intendants managed the administration of généralités, assisted by a secretary known as the subdélégué général. Each généralité was subdivided into subdélégations (akin to subprefectures), led by a subdélégué (comparable to a subprefect) appointed by the intendant. Subdélégations were further divided into arrondissements (equivalent to modern cantons), officially termed arrondissements de correspondance de la subdélégation. Each arrondissement was overseen by a correspondent, appointed by the intendant upon the subdélégué’s recommendation.

Intendants received an average pension of 10,000 pounds, while subdélégués were unpaid and often held concurrent roles such as magistrates, civil administrators, or military officers.

In 1789 the fledgling National Assembly used this structure as a model to create departments and districts. Later, Napoleon Bonaparte adapted it to establish the modern system of prefects and subprefects.

From 1789 to 1980 the intendant's responsibilities were divided between the prefect and the military intendant.

== Origins of the intendants ==
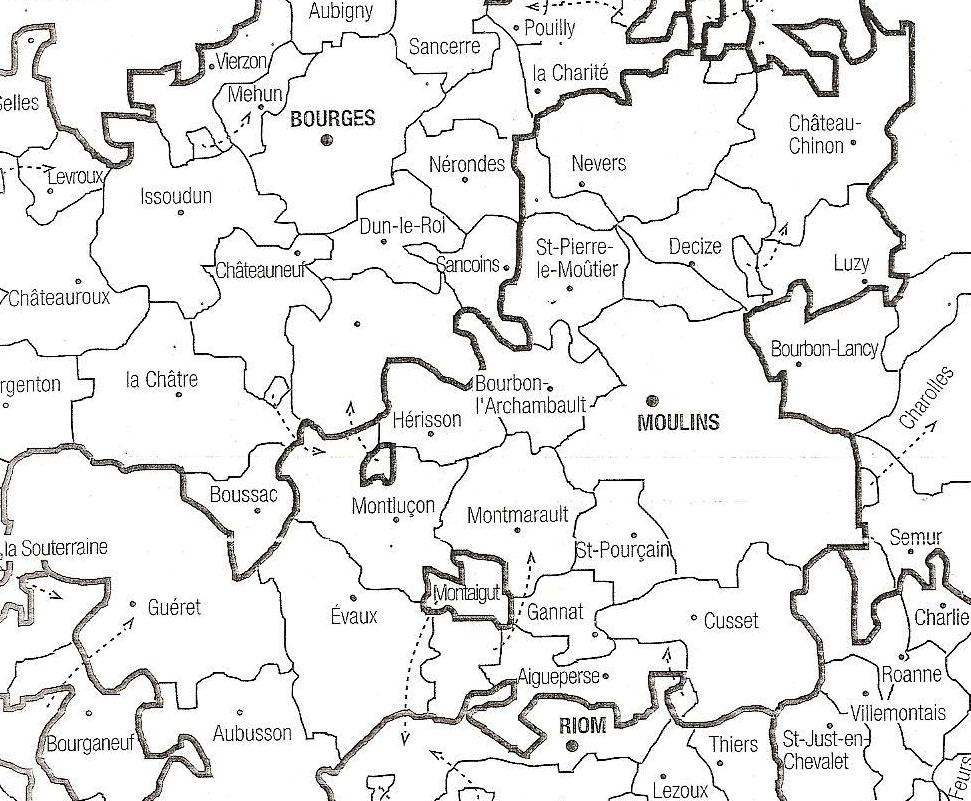
The Généralité of Moulins divided into subdélégations.

As early as the 15th century, the king dispatched commissioners to the provinces to inspect local authorities and implement necessary measures. These commissioners were drawn from maîtres des requêtes, conseillers d'État, members of the Parlements, or the Chambres des comptes. Their assignments were temporary to prevent the re-emergence of feudal power structures. Intendants also served with armies, managing police, provisions, and finances, overseeing accountants, suppliers, and generals, and attending war councils for military offenses. Intendants are recorded in Bourges in 1592, Troyes in 1594, and Limoges in 1596.

The term "intendant" emerged in the 1620s, with the official title "intendant de justice, police et finances" (intendant of justice, police, and finances). Their roles were initially temporary and focused on inspection. Article 58 of the Code Michau outlined their duties (without using the term intendant): to "investigate all crimes, abuses, and malfeasances committed by our officers and other matters concerning our service and the relief of our people." With France's entry into the Thirty Years' War in 1635, intendants became permanent fixtures. From 1633, Chancellor Séguier formalized the system: within their généralité, intendants, as direct agents of royal authority, oversaw municipal bodies, managed the allocation and collection of direct taxes, and suppressed anti-tax riots. They transitioned from inspectors to administrators. During the Fronde in 1648, the Chambre Saint-Louis parliamentarians secured the temporary abolition of intendants. Mazarin and Anne of Austria conceded, except in frontier provinces threatened by Spanish and Imperial forces. After the Fronde, intendants were reinstated nationwide. By 1680, intendants held fixed posts within a généralité, with the title "intendant de justice, police, and finances, commissioner dispatched to the généralités of the kingdom for the execution of the king’s orders."

In the 17th and 18th centuries, intendants typically came from the nobility of the robe or the upper bourgeoisie, often serving as maîtres des requêtes at the Conseil des parties. They were selected by the Controller-General of Finances, with input from the Secretary of State for War for those assigned to frontier provinces. Many were appointed at a young age, such as Calonne at 17, Turgot and Berthier de Sauvigny at 34, and Tourny at 40.

== Functions of the Intendants ==
Appointed and revocable by the king, an intendant in his généralité relied on a small team of secretaries. By the 18th century, généralités were divided into subdélégations, each led by a subdélégué chosen by the intendant, supported by a minimal staff. With limited resources, intendants handled a broad range of responsibilities.

As intendant de justice, they oversaw tribunals (except the parlements, with which they frequently clashed). They ensured judicial officers were neither slow, negligent, nor overly lenient, particularly toward nobles, nor excessively greedy for fees. Intendants held the right of évocation, allowing them to transfer cases between tribunals for fairer judgments. They could also personally adjudicate cases with royal judges. This encroachment on judicial officers’ prerogatives and incomes made intendants fierce adversaries of the judiciary, which repeatedly demanded their abolition or curtailment.

As intendant de police, they maintained public order, commanded the maréchaussée, and monitored public opinion. They managed troop provisioning and military logistics, oversaw the provincial militia, and intervened in religious affairs, particularly monitoring Protestants. In many provinces, intendants diligently enforced Louis XIV's anti-Protestant policies. They also supervised educational institutions.

As intendant des finances, they allocated direct royal taxes (at least in pays d’élection), managed the king's domanial rights (e.g., centième denier, petit scel, franc-fief), updated the king's terriers, and oversaw the financial management of communities (e.g., religious, educational). They enforced fiscal measures like the capitation and the 1696 armorial edict, primarily a tax measure.

Beyond these roles, intendants played an economic role, conducting surveys of the kingdom's state (notably the Mémoires pour l’instruction du duc de Bourgogne under Louis XIV). They promoted agricultural innovation, introducing new crops and improving livestock breeding (e.g., Turgot in Limousin). They established and inspected royal manufactures, managed gunpowder and saltpeter production, maintained and expanded road networks, oversaw postal services, and enhanced urban infrastructure (e.g., Tourny in Bordeaux). They mediated disputes over customs duties, opened charity workshops for the unemployed, established beggar depots, and ensured food supplies during subsistence crises by purchasing and redistributing grain.

As symbols of monarchical centralization, intendants, as appointed and revocable commissioners, faced opposition from officers who owned their positions. Critics like the duc de Saint-Simon, nostalgic for a nobility-based administration, and advocates of a tempered monarchy, like Fénelon, called for their abolition. Necker, the only Minister of Finance since 1720 who was not an intendant, criticized their youth and ambition. The cahiers de doléances of 1789 portrayed them as zealous enforcers of burdensome fiscal policies.

== Notable intendants ==
- François Barbé-Marbois, at Saint-Domingue and later first president of the Cour des comptes.
- Bégon, at Rochefort and La Rochelle, namesake of the begonia; his son, Michel Bégon de La Picardière, intendant of New France.
- Claude-François Bertrand de Boucheporn, intendant of Corsica (1775–1785), later of Pau, Bayonne, and Auch (1785–1790).
- Bertrand de Molleville, intendant of Brittany, later Minister of the Navy and Colonies.
- Paul Esprit Feydeau de Brou, intendant of Brittany (1716–1727) during the 1720 Rennes fire and the Pontcallec conspiracy, namesake of Île Feydeau in Nantes; appointed Keeper of the Seals of France by Louis XV in 1762.
- Blossac, at Poitiers, nephew of Feydeau de Brou.
- Calonne, at Metz and Lille, later Controller-General of Finances.
- Dupré de Saint-Maur, at Bordeaux.
- Nicolas Fouquet, at Grenoble, Picardy, and Paris.
- La Galaizière, at Soissons and Lorraine, where he served as chancellor under King Stanislas.
- Jean-Emmanuel Guignard, vicomte de Saint-Priest (1714–1785), intendant of Languedoc (1751–1785).
- Montyon, at Poitiers, Auvergne, and Provence; economist.
- Tourny, at Limoges and Bordeaux.
- Turgot, at Limoges, later Controller-General of Finances.
- Jean Talon, in New France.
- François-Jean Orceau de Fontette, in the Généralité of Caen.
- Gaspard-Louis Rouillé d'Orfeuil, at La Rochelle and Châlons-en-Champagne.
- Antoine Jullien, in the Généralité of Alençon.
- Le Bret de Flacourt, in Provence.
- Le Peletier de Souzy, in the Généralité of Besançon (1668) and Généralité of Lille (1668–1683).

== See also ==
- Ancien Régime
- Absolute monarchy in France
- French Revolution
- Controller-General of Finances
- Fronde
- Thirty Years' War
- Noblesse de robe
- Pays d'élection

== Bibliography ==
- Antoine, Michel (1982). "Genèse de l'institution des intendants" [Genesis of the Institution of Intendants]. Journal des savants (in French). 3 (3–4): 283–317. doi:10.3406/jds.1982.1455. Archived from the original on 3 June 2018.
- Barbiche, Bernard (1999). Les institutions de la monarchie française à l'époque moderne [The Institutions of the French Monarchy in the Modern Era] (in French). Paris: PUF. p. 430. ISBN 9782130481959.
- Bely, Lucien (2003). Dictionnaire de l'Ancien Régime [Dictionary of the Ancien Régime] (in French). Paris: PUF. ISBN 978-2-13-054033-5.
- Bordes, Maurice (1972). L'administration provinciale et municipale en France au XVIIIe siècle [Provincial and Municipal Administration in France in the 18th Century] (in French). Paris: SEDES. p. 378.
- Drévillon, Hervé (2011). Les rois absolus (1629–1715) [The Absolute Kings (1629–1715)] (in French). Paris: Belin. ISBN 978-2-7011-5868-6.
- Emmanuelli, François-Xavier (1981). Un mythe de l'absolutisme bourbonien: L'intendance du milieu du XVIIe à la fin du XVIIIe (France, Espagne, Amérique) [A Myth of Bourbon Absolutism: The Intendancy from the Mid-17th to the Late 18th Century (France, Spain, America)] (in French). Aix-en-Provence: Université de Provence. p. 199.
- Generalites (2017). Mémoires abrégés des Généralités du royaume de France, dressés par les intendants des provinces [Abridged Memoirs of the Généralités of the Kingdom of France, Compiled by the Intendants of the Provinces] (in French). Len Pod. ISBN 978-2-3394-2732-1.
- Miossec, Jean-Marie (2009). Géohistoire de la régionalisation en France: l'horizon régional [Geohistory of Regionalization in France: The Regional Horizon] (in French). Paris: PUF. p. 602. ISBN 978-2-13-056756-1.
- Smedley-Weill, Annette (1995). Les intendants de Louis XIV [The Intendants of Louis XIV] (in French). Paris: Fayard. p. 370. ISBN 2-213-59490-2.
