= Viotti (surname) =

Viotti is an Italian surname. Notable people with the surname include:

- Giovanni Battista Viotti Italian composer
- Giulio Viotti, Italian painter
- Marcello Viotti, Swiss conductor (1954–2005)
- Maria Luiza Ribeiro Viotti, Brazilian diplomat
- Sérgio Viotti, Brazilian actor and director
- Sergio Viotti (footballer) (born 1990)

== Other ==
- Carrozzeria Viotti
- Viotti International Music Competition
- Viotti Stradivarius
- Viotti Festival
