= Peninsulares =

Inhabitants of Spain and their descendants who immigrated to the Americas

In the context of the Spanish Empire, a peninsular (Spanish pronunciation: [peninsuˈlaɾ], pl. peninsulares) was a Spaniard born in Spain, but residing in the New World, Spanish East Indies, or Spanish Guinea. In the context of the Portuguese Empire, reinóis (singular reinol) were Portuguese people born in Portugal residing primarily in Portuguese America; children born in Brazil to two reinóis parents were known as mazombos.

Spaniards born in the Spanish Philippines were called insular/es or, originally, filipino/s, before "Filipino" came to be applied to all of the modern citizens of the now sovereign independent Philippines. Spaniards born in the colonies of the New World that today comprises the Hispanic America are called criollos (individuals of full Spanish descent born in the New World).

Higher offices in Spanish America and the Spanish Philippines were held by peninsulares. Apart from the distinction of peninsulares from criollo, the castas system distinguished also mestizos of mixed Spanish and Amerindian ancestry in the Americas, and 'mestizos de español' (mixed Spanish and native Filipino (Spanish Filipino)), or 'tornatrás' (mixed Spanish and Sangley Chinese (Chinese Filipino)) in the Philippines / Spanish East Indies, mulatos (of mixed Spanish and black ancestry), indios (Amerindians / Native Filipinos), zambos (mixed Amerindian and black ancestry) and finally negros. In some places and times, such as during the wars of independence, peninsulares or members of conservative parties were called depreciatively godos (meaning Goths, referring to the "Visigoths", who had ruled Spain and were considered the origin of Spanish aristocracy) or, in Mexico, gachupines. Godos is still used pejoratively in the Canary Islands for the peninsular Spanish, and in Chile for Spaniards.

== See also ==
- Dominant minority
- Isleños
- Gachupín
- Peninsular Spain
- Peninsular Spanish
- List of governors in the viceroyalty of the Río de la Plata
- List of viceroys of New Granada
- List of viceroys of New Spain
- List of viceroys of Peru
