= Luca Salsi =

Italian opera singer

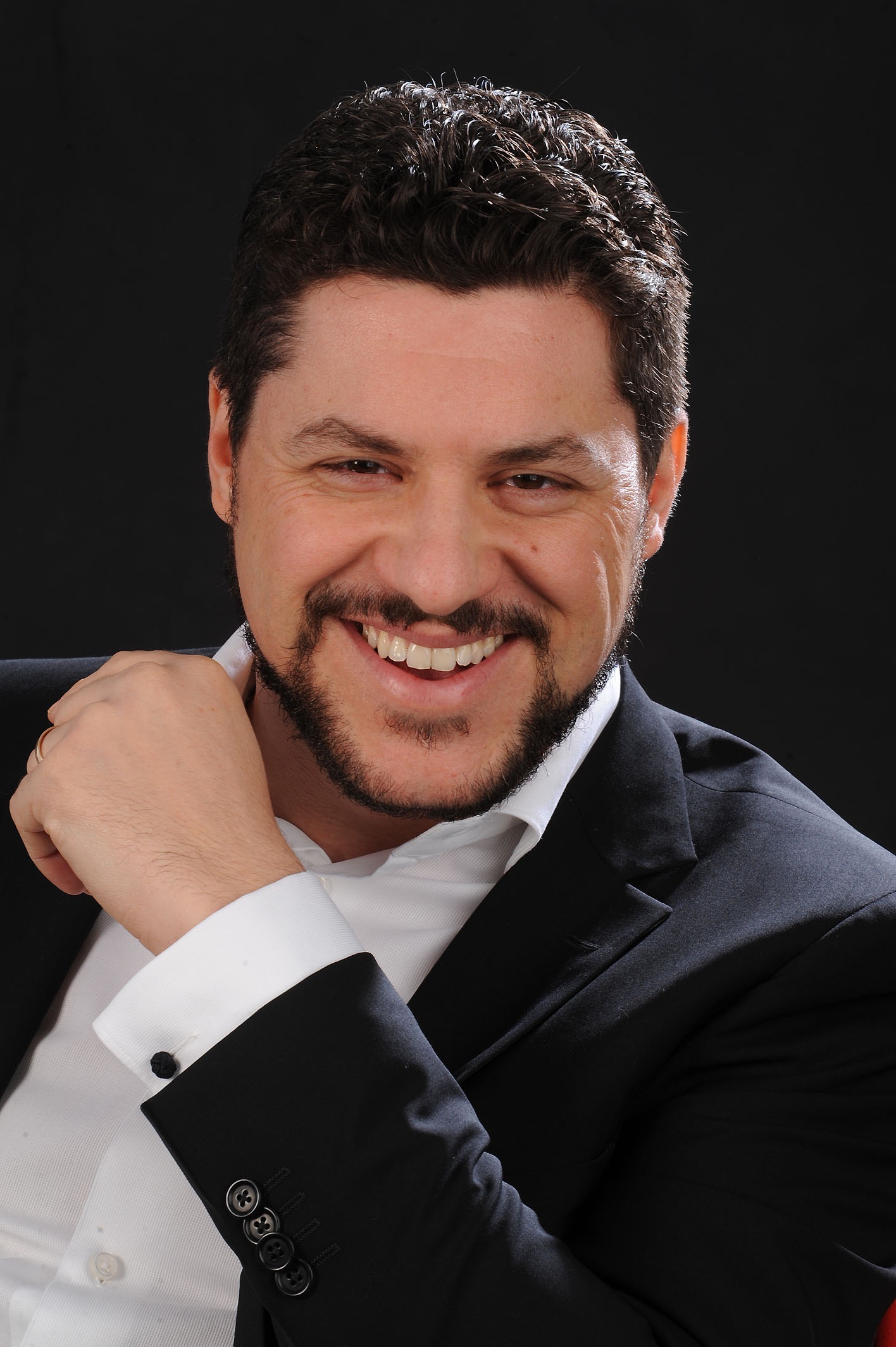
- Salsi in 2010
- Born: 19 March 1975 (age 50); San Secondo Parmense, Italy
- Education: Conservatorio di Musica Arrigo Boito
- Occupation: Operatic baritone

Luca Salsi (born 19 March 1975) is an Italian operatic baritone, who is known for portraying characters in Giuseppe Verdi's operas at leading opera houses internationally. He was recognised by the international press in April 2015 when he not only stepped in on short notice at the Metropolitan Opera in an afternoon performance of Verdi's Ernani, but also performed the same evening in Donizetti's Lucia di Lammermoor as planned. Salsi opened four seasons at La Scala in Milan.

== Life and career ==
Salsi was born in San Secondo Parmense on 19 March 1975. He studied at the Conservatorio di Musica Arrigo Boito in Parma with the soprano Lucetta Bizzi and at the Accademia Rossiniana with Alberto Zedda. He attended masterclasses with Carlo Meliciani, among others.

Salsi made his stage debut in 1997 at the Teatro Comunale di Bologna in Rossini's La scala di seta, leading to further roles there. In 2000 he won a first prize at the Viotti Festival in Vercelli which had not been awarded in 25 years. Within the same year he appeared as Leporello in Mozart's Don Giovanni at the Bassano Festival, Guglielmo in Così fan tutte at the Teatro Lirico di Cagliari and in Bologna, and Antonio in Rossini's Il viaggio a Reims. He later performed in the title role of both Rossini's Il barbiere di Siviglia in Naples, and Mozart's Le nozze di Figaro, at the Washington National Opera, invited by Plácido Domingo.

He soon also appeared at leading opera houses and festivals of the world including the Los Angeles Opera, the Maggio Musicale Fiorentino, many Italian opera houses, and the Festival Puccini in Torre del Lago. He collaborated with conductors including James Conlon, James Levine, Daniele Gatti, Gustavo Dudamel, Nicola Luisotti, Donato Renzetti and Alberto Zedda, and with directors such as Robert Carsen, Werner Herzog, Franco Zeffirelli and David McVicar.

From the 2012/13 season he performed Verdi roles, Don Carlo in La forza del destino in his first performance at the Liceu in Barcelona, followed there by Macbeth and Nabucco. He first appeared at the Salzburg Festival in 2015 in a concert performance of Ernani, conducted by Riccardo Muti, followed by Amonasro in Verdi's Aida there in 2017, and the title role of Verdi's Simon Boccanegra in 2019. He appeared in Verdi's Un ballo in maschera in Bologna, as both Lord Ashton in Donizetti's Lucia di Lammermoor and Posa in Verdi's Don Carlo at the Metropolitan Opera (Met) in New York City, as Germont in Verdi's La traviata at the Teatro Regio in Turin, the Royal Opera House in London and the Bavarian State Opera, Nabucco at the Arena di Verona, Macbeth and Nabucco in Barcelona, Verdi' Rigoletto at the Teatro Real in Madrid, as Francesco Foscari in I due Foscari at La Scala in Milan, Verdi's Falstaff at the Lyric Opera of Chicago, and Macbeth at the Royal Swedish Opera.

He was recognised especially in April 2015 when he not only stepped in on 30 minutes notice at the Met for Plácido Domingo in an afternoon performance of Ernani, but also performed the same evening in Lucia di Lammermoor as planned.

Salsi is known especially for his Verdi repertoire. He first appeared as Carlo Gérard in Giordano's Andrea Chénier, alongside Jonas Kaufmann and Anja Harteros, at the Bavarian State Opera in 2017. He performed as Rigoletto at the Dutch National Opera, directed by Damiano Michieletto. He first appeared as Scarpia in Puccini's Tosca in Rome. He opened four seasons at La Scala, the 2017/18 season in Andrea Chénier, chosen by conductor Riccardo Chailly, in 2019 as Scarpia, in 2020 in a memorial concert, and in 2021 as Macbeth. He appeared at the Metropolitan Opera also Luna in Il trovatore, La Traviata, and Verdi's Luisa Miller.

In 2023 he reprised Macbeth at the Berlin State Opera in a 2018 production by Harry Kupfer, alongside Anna Netrebko as Lady Macbeth. A reviewer noted that he performed as a "gripping warlord, regicide and king", in the beginning hesitant, then as an "ever stronger ambitious usurper", with a "fantastically balanced, sonorous baritone", tension and intensity.
