= Intendant =

Term for public official in non-English-speaking countries

An intendant (French: [ɛ̃tɑ̃dɑ̃]; Portuguese: intendente [ĩtẽˈdẽtɨ]; Spanish: intendente [intenˈdente]) was, and sometimes still is, a public official, especially in France, Spain, Portugal, and Latin America. The intendancy system was a centralizing administrative system developed in France. In the War of the Spanish Succession of 1701 to 1714 the French royal House of Bourbon secured its hold on the throne of Spain; it extended a French-style intendancy system to Spain and Portugal, and subsequently worldwide through the Spanish Empire and Portuguese Empire. Regions were divided into districts, each administered by an intendant. The title continues in use in Spain and in parts of Spanish America for particular government officials.

== Development of the system in France ==
Intendants were royal civil servants in France under the Old Regime. A product of the centralization policies of the French crown, intendants were appointed "commissions," and not purchasable hereditary "offices," which thus prevented the abuse of sales of royal offices and made them more tractable and subservient emissaries of the king. Intendants were sent to supervise and enforce the king's will in the provinces and had jurisdiction over three areas: finances, policing and justice.

Their missions were always temporary, which helped reduce favorable bias toward a province, and were focused on royal inspection. Article 54 of the Code Michau described their functions as "to learn about all crimes, misdemeanors and financial misdealings committed by our officials and of other things concerning our service and the tranquility of our people" ("informer de tous crimes, abus et malversations commises par nos officiers et autres choses concernant notre service et le soulagement de notre peuple").

In the 17th and 18th centuries, the intendants were chosen from the noblesse de robe ("administrative nobility") or the upper-bourgeoisie. Generally, they were masters of requests in the Conseil des parties. They were chosen by the Controller-General of Finances who asked the advice of the Secretary of State for War for those who were to be sent in border provinces. They were often young: Charles Alexandre de Calonne became an intendant at the age of 32, Turgot and Louis Bénigne François Berthier de Sauvigny at the age of 34, and Louis-Urbain-Aubert de Tourny at the age of 40.

A symbol of royal centralization and absolutism, the intendant had numerous adversaries. Those nostalgic for an administration based on noble lineage (such as Saint-Simon) saw intendants as parvenus and usurpers of noble power. Partisans of a less absolute monarchy (such as Fénelon) called for them to be abolished. Jacques Necker, the only Minister of Finances since 1720 who had not himself been an intendant, accused them of incompetence because of their youth and social aspirations. The cahiers de doléances of 1789 depicted them as over zealous agents of fiscal policies which weighed heavily on the people.

The term intendant was also used for certain positions close to the Controller-General of Finances (see this term for more information):

- intendants of finance
- intendants of commerce
- intendants of the sovereign council

In the same way, the term intendant général was used for certain commissioned positions close to the State Secretaries of War and of the Navy.

=== History ===
As early as the 15th century, the French kings sent commissioners to the provinces to report on royal and administrative issues and to undertake any necessary action. These agents of the king were recruited from among the masters of requests, the Councillors of State and members of the Parlements or the Court of Accounts. Their mission was always for a specific mandate and lasted for a limited period. Along with these, there were also commissioners sent to the army, in charge of provisioning the army, policing and finances; they would supervise accountants, providers, merchants, and generals, and attend war councils and tribunals for military crimes. Such commissioners are found in Corsica as early as 1553, in Bourges in 1592, in Troyes in 1594, and in Limoges in 1596.

When Henry IV ascended the throne in 1589, one of his prime focuses was to reduce the privileges of the provincial governors who, in theory, represented "the presence of the king in his province" but had, during the civil wars of the early modern period, proven themselves to be highly intractable; these positions had long been held by only the highest ranked noble families in the realm. The Intendants to the provinces – the term "Intendant" appears around 1620 during the reign of Louis XIII – became an effective tool of regional control.

Under Louis XIII's minister Cardinal Richelieu, with France's entry into the Thirty Years' War in 1635, the Intendants became a permanent institution in France. No longer mere inspectors, their role became one of government administrators. During the Fronde in 1648, the members of Parlement of the Chambre Saint-Louis demanded that the Intendants be suppressed; Mazarin and Anne of Austria gave in to these demands except in the case of border provinces threatened by Spanish or Imperial attack. At the end of the Fronde, the Intendants were reinstated.

When Louis XIV (1643–1715) was in power, the Marquis of Louvois, War Secretary between 1677 and 1691, further expanded the power of the provincial intendants. They monitored Louis's refinements of the French military, including the institution of a merit promotion system and a policy of enlistment limited to single men for periods of four years. After 1680, Intendants in France had a permanent position in a fixed region (or "généralité"); their official titles being intendant de justice, police et finances, commissaires départis dans les généralités du royaume pour l'exécution des ordres du roi (or de Sa Majesté).

The position of Intendant remained in existence until the French Revolution. The title was maintained thereafter for military officers with responsibility for financial auditing at regimental level and above.

A 2021 study, which used a dataset of 430 intendants from 1640 to 1789, found that less than half of these officials went through the legally-specified training path. The study raised questions about the impersonal nature of these bureaucrats, with evidence indicating that familial and marital ties were factors in appointments, and that appointment duration had wide variability.

=== Functions ===
Appointed and revoked by the king and reporting to the Controller-General of Finances, the Intendant in his "généralité" had at his service a small team of secretaries. In the 18th century, the "généralité" was subdivided into "subdelegations" at the head of which was placed a "subdelegate" (having also a team of secretaries) chosen by the Intendant. In this way, the Intendant was relatively understaffed given his large jurisdiction.

=== Notable intendants ===
- Claude-François Bertrand de Boucheporn, in Corsica then Pau, Bayonne and Auch
- Paul Esprit Marie de la Bourdonnaye in Poitiers
- Charles Alexandre de Calonne in Metz, then in Lille, future Controller-General of Finances
- Nicolas-François Dupré de Saint-Maur in Bordeaux
- Antoine-Martin Chaumont de La Galaizière in Soissons then in Lorraine
- Jean-Baptiste Antoine Auget de Montyon in Poitiers
- Louis-Urbain-Aubert de Tourny in Limoges, then in Bordeaux
- Anne-Robert-Jacques Turgot in Limoges, future Controller-General of Finances

=== New France ===
The French North American colony of New France, which later became the Canadian province of Quebec, also had a senior official called an intendant, who was responsible to the French King. New France's first intendant was Jean Talon, comte d'Orsainville in 1665, and the last one, at the time of the British conquest of Quebec was François Bigot.

== Spain and Spanish Empire ==
Intendants were introduced into Spain and the Spanish Empire during the eighteenth-century Bourbon Reforms. The reforms were designed by the new dynasty to make political administration more efficient and to promote economic, commercial, and fiscal development of their new realms. An intendente was in charge of a Spanish administrative unit, called an intendencia, which could include one or more provinces. The intendente was appointed directly by the Crown and had responsibility to oversee the treasury, the collection of taxes, and corruption practices and to promote agriculture and economic growth in general. With fiscal powers that gave them a say in almost all administrative, ecclesiastical and military matters, intendentes were conceived by the Bourbon kings to be a check on other local officials (who in the past couple of centuries had come to gain their position through the sale of offices or inheritance), just as the intendants had been in France a century earlier. Throughout the 18th century the Bourbons experimented with the powers and duties of the intendants, both in Spain and overseas, so what follows is only a general description of the Spanish intendancy. In any given area at any given time, the duties of the intendant would have been specified by the laws that established that particular intendancy.

The first intendencias were established in Spain after 1711, during the War of the Spanish Succession on the advice of Jean Orry, who had been sent by Louis XIV of France to help his young grandson Philip V set up his new government. The first intendants (superintendentes generales del ejército) oversaw the finances of the army and of the territories conquered by the Bourbons, and after the war, they were made permanent (intendentes de ejército y provincia). (After 1724, most intendancies lost their military character except in areas with a captaincy general and in Navarre.) In 1749 an intendancy was established in every province, with the intendant also holding the office of corregidor of the capital city. (The offices were separated again in 1766). District alcaldes mayores or coregidores were subordinated to the provincial intendente-corregidor and assisted him in managing the province and implementing reforms.

As a result of the Seven Years' War an intendancy was set up in Cuba in 1764. The Cuban intendant had oversight of the army's and the royal treasury's finances. (Two new intendancies with oversight only over the treasury were established in 1786 in Camagüey and Santiago de Cuba.) After a two years of experimentation with the new office, an intendancy was introduced in Louisiana (1764).

That same year Visitador General José de Gálvez created a plan to set up intendancies in New Spain (Mexico). The first one was set up in central Mexico in 1786, followed in 1787 by Veracruz, Puebla, Valladolid in Michoacan, Guadalajara, Oaxaca, Guanajuato, Zacatecas, San Luis Potosí, Durango, Sonora, and in 1789 Mérida, the main city in Yucatán. These administrative changes codified existing regional divisions of Center (Mexico, Veracruz, Puebla, Michoacan), South (Oaxaca, Mérida), and North (Zacatecas, Guanajuato, San Luis Potosí, Durango, and Sonora).

In 1776 Gálvez, now Minister of the Indies, established an intendancy (superintendencia) for all of Venezuela in 1776, and several in the Río de la Plata in 1783. Most of the overseas intendants were assisted by officials (subdelegados) who replaced the old corregidores or alcaldes mayores. Initially intendancies were held by a separate person from the viceroy or the governor, but eventually in many places the offices were granted to one person due to conflicts that emerged between these two.

More intendancies were established in Quito, Peru, Philippines, Puerto Rico (1784), Guatemala, more areas of New Spain, Chile (1786) and Cuenca (1786). The Revolt of the Comuneros prevented their installation in New Granada.

== Portugal and Portuguese Empire ==
In Portugal, historically, the title "intendant" (intendente in Portuguese) has been mainly associated with police roles.

From 1760 to 1832, the head of the Police of the Kingdom of Portugal had the title of "Intendant General of the Police of the Court and of the Kingdom". A similar title - that of "Intendant General of the Public Security" - was used from 1928 to 1932 to designate the head of the Portuguese Civil Police.

== Current use in Hispanic and Lusophone countries ==
=== Portugal ===
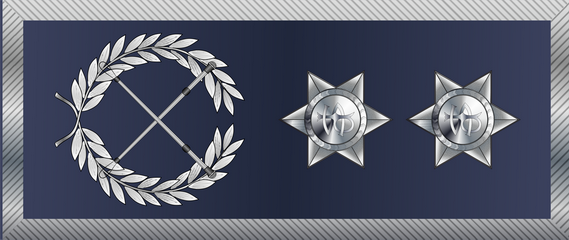
Rank insignia of an intendant of the Portuguese Public Security Police.

Presently, intendant is a rank of officer in the Public Security Police, roughly equivalent to the military rank of lieutenant-colonel. Analogously, the police rank of sub-intendant corresponds to the rank of major, while the police rank of superintendent corresponds to the rank of colonel.

The rank insignia of an intendant consists of a dark blue epaulet with two crossed horsewhips inside a laurel wreath and two PSP stars. Each PSP star consists in a six points silver star with the "SP" monogram in the center. The rank insignia of a sub-intendant is similar but with only a single PSP star.

=== Spain ===
Nowadays in the Spanish armed forces, the title Intendant refers to a Colonel in the Supply Branch either in the Navy, Army or Air Force. It is also used in some branches of the administration such as the Catalan Police, (Mossos d'Esquadra in Catalan) or in some Autonomous Communities (Comunidades Autónomas in Spanish).

=== Argentina ===
In Argentina, intendente (m) or intendenta (f) refers to city mayors – heads of government of municipalities (or partidos in Buenos Aires Province). This meaning is not at all connected to the usage in other countries. Spanish-language media in countries other than Argentina tend to refer to Argentine city mayors as alcaldes, which is the most common Spanish word for mayor. In the Argentine Army, "Intendencia" is the Spanish name of the Quartermaster Corps, and its members are informally called "intendentes". In some organizations, such as clubs, gated communities, large companies, etc., "intendente" is the name given to the person in charge of general maintenance of common spaces.

=== Chile ===
Chile is administratively divided in 16 regions. Between 1976 (1974 in some regions) and 2021, each region was headed by an intendant, appointed by the president.

=== Cuba ===
In Cuba, the intendant was introduced by the Constitution of the Republic (2019) to head the Administrative Councils - subordinate to the Municipal Assemblies of People's Power (town halls) - and with strictly executive-administrative functions. As the highest local authority is the President of the Municipal Assembly (mayor), it is up to him to designate and remove the intendant, after agreement with the majority of the Delegates of People's Power (councilors).

=== Paraguay ===
The Republic of Paraguay is administratively divided into 17 departamentos (departments), each of which is headed by an gobernador departamental (departmental governor). These departamentos are divided into 261 distritos (districts) (plus the capital district), districts are headed by an intendente municipal (municipal intendant), these intendants are popularly elected, and serve a term of five years.

=== Uruguay ===
Uruguay is divided administratively into 19 departamentos (departments). The executive power of each department is the intendencia (intendancy), headed by an intendente departamental (departmental intendant). The intendants are popularly elected, and serve a term of five years.

== Russia and Soviet Union ==
The position of intendant was part of the tsarist Russian army from 1812 to 1868; intendants were responsible for supplies, finances, etc. in the field. After the 1935 rank reform that established 'personal ranks' in the Soviet military, it was reintroduced as the rank title for administrative and supply officers. The specific ranks, their collar insignia, and their line equivalents were:

- technician-intendant second class, two rectangles, lieutenant
- technician-intendant first class, three rectangles, senior lieutenant
- intendant third class, one rectangle, captain
- intendant second class, two rectangles, major
- intendant first class, three rectangles, colonel.
- brigindendant (i.e., brigade intendant), one diamond, kombrig (brigade commander)
- divintendant (i.e., division intendant), two diamonds, komdiv (division commander)
- korindendant (i.e., corps intendant), three diamonds, komkor (corps commander)
- armintendant (i.e., army intendant), four diamonds, komandarm (army commander) second class.

On 7 May 1940, the rank title system for all Soviet Army senior officers was changed to bring it closer in line with standard European practice, and the ranks of major general of the intendant service, lieutenant general of the intendant service, and colonel general of the intendant service were introduced. Senior officers from brigintendant to armintendant rank underwent a re-attestation process and were given a general rank.

On 30 March 1942, the 'intendant' ranks equivalent to those between lieutenant and colonel were abolished, and officers holding those ranks also underwent a re-attestation process and received ranks ranging from lieutenant of the intendant service to colonel of the administrative service.

== Scotland ==
In Scotland intendant is an archaic title meaning "supervisor" or "curator". The senior officer of the City of Glasgow Police was called an Intendant in the document establishing the force in 1800.

== United States ==
For much of its history, the chief magistrate of the city of Charleston, South Carolina was the Intendant of the City, roughly corresponding to a mayor. The title Intendant was also used in other Lowcountry towns, where the office was assisted by "wardens," a system which may have derived from earlier ecclesiastical administration under colonial rule.

== Other uses ==
It is also commonly found today in many theaters and opera houses in Europe, where it is the equivalent to the title of general director, given to an individual in a managerial position, generally having control over all aspects of the company.

In Star Trek: Deep Space Nine, Intendant was a title in the mirror universe. The mirror universe version of Kira Nerys held the position of Intendant of Bajor.

== See also ==
- Bourbon reforms
- List of governors and intendants in the Viceroyalty of New Spain
- List of intendants in the Viceroyalty of the Río de la Plata
- Quartermaster
