= Guido Rimonda =

Italian violinist and conductor (born 1969)

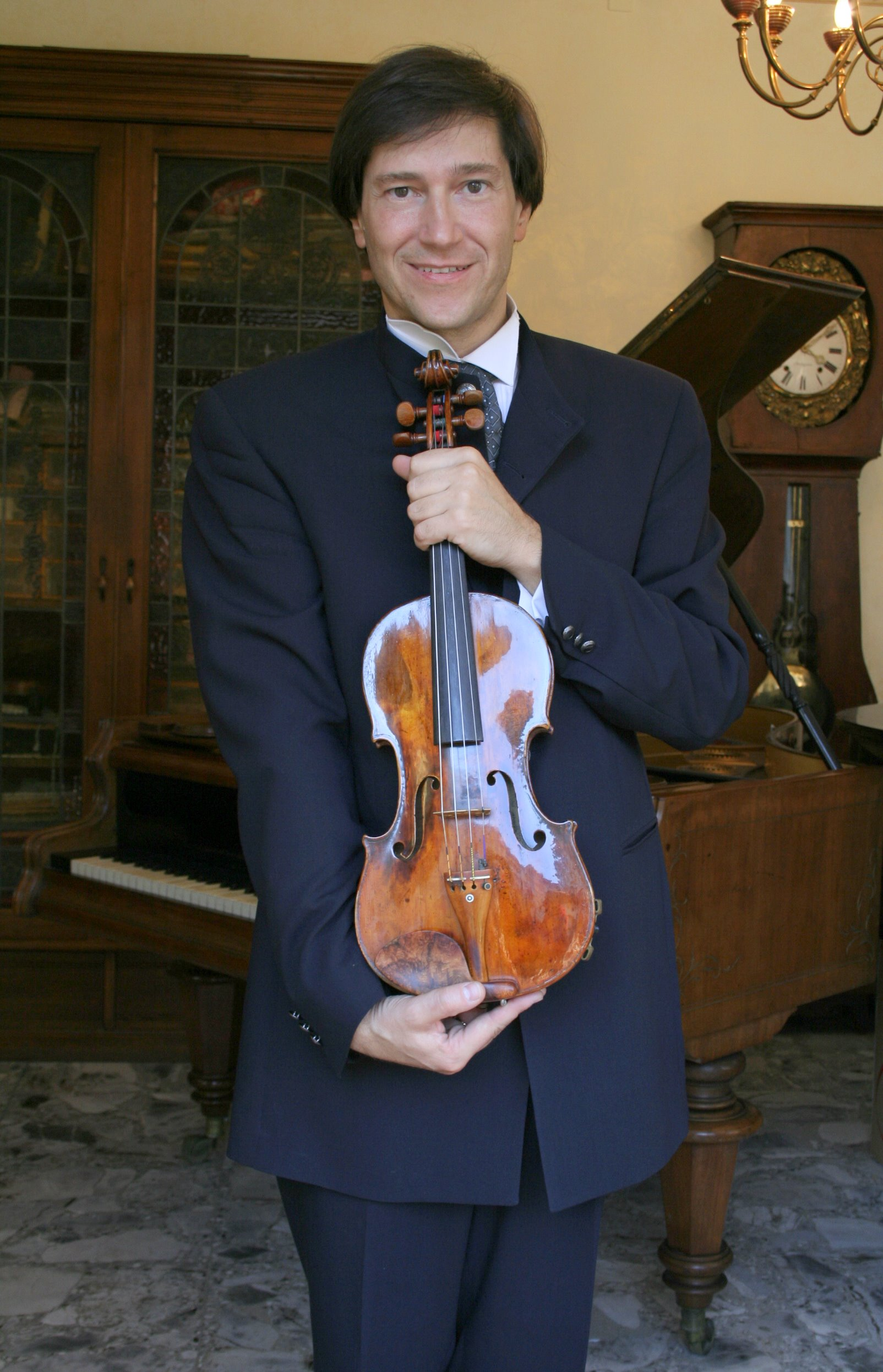
- Guido Rimonda in 2009

Background information
- Born: 1969 (age 56–57); Italy
- Genres: Classical
- Occupations: Conductor, pedagogue, violinist
- Instrument: Violin
- Website: http://www.guidorimonda.com

Guido Rimonda (born 1969) is an Italian violinist and conductor.

== Biography ==
Born at Saluzzo in Piedmont, Rimonda studied the violin under Corrado Romano, Franco Gulli, Renato Biffoli, Renato de Barbieri, Edoardo Oddone and Ruggiero Ricci. He made his debut at the age of 13 as the player of Corelli's sonatas in the film entitled Per Antonio Vivaldi, directed by Massimo Scaglione. Rimonda began his teaching career as the assistant of Giuliano Carmignola and Franco Gulli at the Scuola di Alto Perfezionamento Musicale, Saluzzo. He currently holds the violin chair at the Conservatorio Giuseppe Verdi in Turin.

Rimonda was recently awarded the Renato Brusòn Prize.

== Recordings ==
- Camille Saint-Saëns: Sonata per violino e piano op.75 N.1 - Charles Dancla: "Petite ecole de la melodie" op.123 - Jules Massenet: Thais (1894) Meditation - Violino:Guido Rimonda, Pianoforte: Cristina Canziani Etichetta: CHANDOS - Inghilterra 2009
- Wolfgang Amadeus Mozart: Integrale dei concerti per violino e orchestra, violino solista Guido Rimonda - Orchestra Filarmonica Italiana (3 cd Fabbri Editori I Grandi Musicisti)
- Antonio Vivaldi: Concerti op.3, Estro Armonio, violino solista Guido Rimonda - Orchestra da camera "Archi del Veneto" (Fabbri Editori I Grandi Musicisti)
- Antonio Vivaldi: Concerti op.12, violino solista Guido Rimonda - Orchestra da camera "Archi del Veneto" (Fabbri Editori I Grandi Musicisti)
- Johann Sebastian Bach: Concerti per violino e archi, Triplo concerto per violino, flauto e clavicembalo - Orchestra Filarmonica Italiana (Fabbri Editori I Grandi Musicisti)
- Alessandro Rolla: Concerto per violino in do maggiore - Sinfonia in re maggiore - Adagio per l'amico Cavinati, violino solista e Direttore Guido Rimonda - Orchestra Alessandro Rolla di Varese (Ed. Bongiovanni, Bologna)
- Tomaso Giovanni Albinoni: Concerti per violino e archi, violino solista Guido Rimonda - Orchestra da camera "Archi del Veneto" (Fabbri Editori I Grandi Musicisti)
- D.Cimarosa, L.Boccherini, G.B.Viotti: Concerti per flauto e orchestra, flautisti: Maxence Larrieu e Giuseppe Nova - Orchestra Camerata Ducale, Direttore Guido Rimonda (Ed. Bongiovanni, Bologna)
- Luigi Boccherini, Wolfgang Amadeus Mozart, Giovanni Battista Viotti: Concerti per violoncello e orchestra e danze tedesche, violoncello Franco Maggio Ormezowski - Orchestra Camerata Ducale, Direttore Guido Rimonda (Ed. Bongiovanni, Bologna)
- Domenico Cimarosa, Luigi Giannella: Il maestro di cappella - Concerto per violino e orchestra (prima registrazione assoluta) - Basso Buffo Enzo Dara, violino solista e direttore Guido Rimonda - Orchestra Camerata Ducale (Ed. Bongiovanni, Bologna)
- Giovanni Battista Viotti: 32 Concerti per violino e orchestra, violino solista e Direttore Guido Rimonda - Orchestra Camerata Ducale (15 cd, Ed. Bongiovanni, Bologna)
- Arcangelo Corelli: Concerti grossi per archi, primo violino e Direttore Guido Rimonda - Orchestra da Camera "Archi del Veneto" (Fabbri Editori I Grandi Musicisti)
- Georg Friedrich Händel: Concerti grossi per archi e fiati, primo violino e Direttore Guido Rimonda - Orchestra Filarmonica Italiana (Fabbri Editori I Grandi Musicisti)
- Georg Friedrich Händel: Concerti grossi per archi, primo violino e Direttore Guido Rimonda - Orchestra Filarmonica Italiana (Fabbri Editori I Grandi Musicisti)
- Joseph Haydn: Sinfonia Il mattino - Il pomeriggio - La sera, violino solista e Direttore Guido Rimonda - Orchestra da Camera "Archi del Veneto" (Fabbri Editori I Grandi Musicisti)
- Giovanni Battista Viotti: Concerto per violino N.24, Concerto per violino, pianoforte e orchestra N.3 e altre composizioni per violino e orchestra (Allegato alla Rivista Amadeus-Novembre 2007 Edizioni Paragon)

== Instrument ==
Rimonda plays a A.Stradivarius “J.M.Leclair” (1721) and a Dario Vernè (1991).

== Bibliography ==
Writings di Guido Rimonda:

- "Quattro secoli di liuteria in Piemonte" di Guido Rimonda e Cristina Canziani ed. Regione Piemonte 1996
- "Tre figli delle Langhe" di Romano Marengo ed. Cremonabooks 1999 (introduzione di Guido Rimonda)
- "La musica ragionata" quattro volumi in edizione anastatica di Carlo Giovanni Testori 1997-1998-1999-2000 (introduzione di Guido Rimonda)
