= August Duranowski =

Polish-French violinist and composer

August (Fryderyk) Duranowski (originally Auguste Frédéric Durand) (c. 1770–1834) was a Polish-French violinist and composer.

== Biography ==
Duranowski was born in Warsaw. He studied the violin in Paris with Giovanni Battista Viotti, becoming leader of the Brussels opera orchestra in 1790. He toured Europe and settled in Strasbourg. One of the most eminent virtuosos of his time and an important influence on Niccolò Paganini, he was known for his extraordinary technique, especially in trilling, bowing and passage-work. Among his compositions, the Concerto in A major op.8 and airs variés for violin and orchestra are noteworthy. He died at Strasbourg.
