= Boucheporn =

- Commune
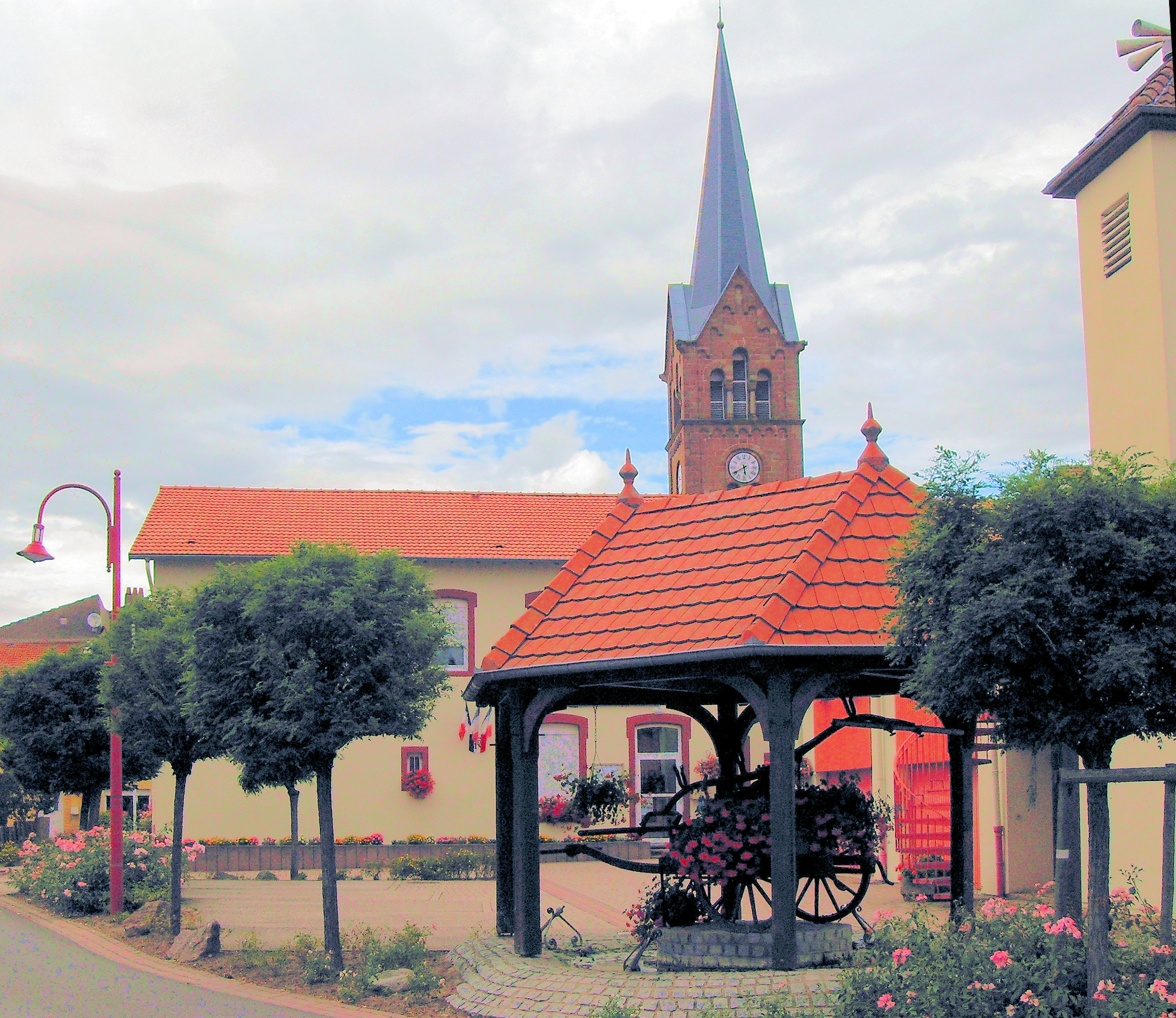
- The town hall in Boucheporn

- Coat of arms
- Location of Boucheporn
- Location within France Location within Grand Est
- Coordinates: 49°08′30″N 6°36′35″E
- Country: France
- Region: Grand Est
- Department: Moselle
- Arrondissement: Forbach-Boulay-Moselle
- Canton: Faulquemont
- Intercommunality: District Urbain de Faulquemont

Government
  - Mayor (2020–2026): Micheline Fickinger
- Area^{1}: 6.65 km^{2} (2.57 sq mi)
- Elevation: 425 m (1,394 ft)
- Highest elevation: 414 m (1,358 ft)
- Lowest elevation: 232 m (761 ft)
- Population (2023): 561
  - Density: 84.4/km^{2} (218/sq mi)
- Time zone: UTC+01:00 (CET)
  - Summer (DST): UTC+02:00 (CEST)
- INSEE/Postal code: 57095 /57220
- ^{1} French Land Register data, which excludes lakes, ponds, glaciers > 1 km^{2} (0.386 sq mi or 247 acres) and river estuaries.

Boucheporn (French pronunciation: [buʃpɔʁn]; German: Buschborn) is a commune in the Moselle department in Grand Est in northeastern France.

== Population ==
Historical population
Year	Pop.	±% p.a.
1968	442	—
1975	453	+0.35%
1982	524	+2.10%
1990	627	+2.27%
1999	554	−1.37%
2007	566	+0.27%
2012	562	−0.14%
2017	581	+0.67%
2023	561	−0.58%
Source: INSEE

== Notable people ==
- Claude-François Bertrand de Boucheporn (1741-1794), intendant of the Ancien Régime

== See also ==
- Communes of the Moselle department
