= Gachupín =

Spanish term for colonial petty nobility

Gachupín is a Spanish-language term derived from a noble surname of northern Spain, the Cachopín of Laredo (present-day Cantabria). It was popularized during the Spanish Golden Age as a stereotype and literary stock character representing the hidalgo (petty nobility) class which was characterized as arrogant and overbearing. It may also be spelled cachopín, guachapín, chaupín or cachupino. The term remained popular in Mexico, where it would come to be used in the Cry of Dolores.

== Definitions, origin and use ==
The Diccionario de Autoridades (1729) defines cachupín as "The Spaniard that goes and lives in the West Indies, called chapetón in Peru. The phrase was brought from those countries, and is frequently used in Andalucia, and between merchants en route to the West Indies." Since the 1780 edition, the academic dictionary, recognizes the variant beginning with the letter "g" understood to have arisen in the New World: "In The Indies, where they say gachupín" or "godo". The 1925 edition signals that the etymology is from the Portuguese cachopo, or child, and restricts the geographic extent of its use to North America. The current Dictionary of the Royal Spanish Academy derives it from the term cachopín.

In 1992, Antonio Alatorre explained that Jorge de Montemayor coined the term in 1557 in his pastoral work La Diana. Montemayor was amused by the interaction of forms and meanings between this prestigious Spanish surname and the word he knew from his native Portuguese cachopo, which means "touchy," "crag," or "boy." In Don Quixote, Cervantes uses the word similarly. This may be a conscious reference to La Diana, as later in Don Quixote, a copy of La Diana is narrowly rescued from being burnt.

In the Iberian Peninsula, the word would lose this unique meaning, though it would survive in La Mancha into the late twentieth century.

In the 18th century, Friar Servando Teresa de Mier inferred that the etymology of gachupín arose from the Nahuatl cactzopini composed of cactli meaning "shoe", and tzopini, meaning "sharp", referring to the Spanish who wore spurs. This method of determining etymology, in use in de Mier's time and earlier, became considered antiquated by the later philology of the 19th-century German neogrammarians. This school would argue against determining etymology primarily through lexical similarity, and not considering Sound change, which they thought to be the driver of lexical evolution.

The word took root especially in Mexico and Central America, referring to the idea of the upstart Spaniard. In the 19th century it was used in pro-independence slogans such as Mueran los gachupines ("Death to the peninsulares") as part of one version of Miguel Hidalgo's Cry of Dolores. Ramón María del Valle-Inclán would bring the word back into the continental vocabulary in his 1926 novel Tirano Banderas.

The word may be used colloquially either ironically or to indicate disrespect, depending on the context.

== Examples ==
- Mi padre es de los Cachopines de Laredo, 1559, Jorge de Montemayor, La Diana
- Y sea assimesmo el cachupín o rezíen venido criado en aldea and no hay hombre, por ignorante que sea, que luego no eche de ver quál sea cachupín y quál nacido en Indias, 1591, J. de Cárdenas, Problemas y Secretos Maravillosos de las Indias.
- Aunque el mío [linaje] es de los Cachopines de Laredo, […] no le osaré yo poner con el del Toboso de la Mancha, puesto que, para decir verdad, semejante apellido hasta ahora no ha llegado a mis oídos, 1605 Cervantes, Don Quixote
- ¡Viva México!, ¡Viva la Virgen de Guadalupe! ¡Mueran los Gachupines! Cry of Dolores

== See also ==
- Peninsular
- Casta
