= Claude-François Bertrand de Boucheporn =

French magistrate

Claude-François Bertrand Boucheporn (4 November 1741 – 20 February 1794) was a French magistrate and intendant of the Ancien Régime, born in Metz (Moselle). He was counselor in the parliament of Metz (1761), General Counsel (1768–1771), Maître des Requêtes to the King's Council (from 1772 to the Revolution), intendant of Corsica (1775–1785), intendant of the Généralité of Pau, Bayonne and Auch (from 1785 to the French Revolution).

Under the Terror, Boucheporn was tried, sentenced to death and beheaded in Toulouse on 20 February 1794 at the age of 53.

== Biography ==
Originating from Metz, Boucheporn's family of parliamentarians was knighted in 1689. His father Louis-Pierre Bertrand de Chailly (1709–1773) was a member of the parliament in Metz. His mother, Marguerite-Henriette Salomon (1717–1786) comes from a noble family in Alsace, possibly of Venetian origin according to tradition and from which the German writer Ernst von Salomon also descends.

Boucheporn married in 1765 Barbe Catherine Dancerville (1742–1803), the daughter of Jean-Pierre Dancerville, president of the Présidial de Metz, with whom he had eight children.

One of his grandsons is the French geologist Félix de Boucheporn (1811–1857), whose son, an artillery officer from the École Polytechnique, being the last of his name and with no descendants, adopted in 1917 his nephew, Roger de Bazelaire de Saulcy, a cavalry officer, who rose up the name of Boucheporn.

=== Counselor to the parliament of Metz ===
Boucheporn read law at the University of Paris and was received as a counselor to the parliament of Metz in 1761, becoming a General Counsel in 1768. In that capacity, in 1771, he pleaded the cause of Mr Le Boeuf de Valdahon in a famous case against the ''Marquis de Monnier'' who was opposing Valdahon's marriage to his daughter, on the ground that he had seduced her eight years before, while she was still under-age.

In 1769, he was received to the Société royale des sciences et des arts de Metz and he attended the works of the lodge of Saint-Jean de l'Amitié de Saint-Étienne in Metz, where he would meet a number of academicians and parliamentarians of this city.

=== Intendant of Corsica (1775–1785) ===
In 1775, at the age of 34, Bertrand de Boucheporn became the third intendant of Corsica, the island which had been ceded to France by the Republic of Genoa via the Treaty of Versailles, in 1768. He spent "ten fruitful years (1775–85) on the island." By his ordonnances he was supportive to the island's development of forestry, agriculture and the industry and he established a plan for enlarging the bridges to enhance transport capabilities and commerce. He also reformed the island's tax system with a new territorial tax replacing all other taxes attached to land's ownership.

Willingly taking into account the islanders' national feelings, he endeavored to reconcile a country still deeply marked by the recent paolist revolts. As he favoured a reform of political representation, "Boucheporn pressed for a fully proportional system within the Estates, but at this juncture the ministers refused to move beyond a position whereby each order returned the same number of deputies."

In Bastia, Mrs de Boucheporn, the intendant's wife, befriended Letizia Buonaparte (born Ramolino), Napoleon's mother; she was the godmother of Louis Bonaparte, Napoleon's brother and the to-be king of Holland, whose godfather was Mr de Marbeuf, the island's governor. Some time later, Boucheporn "helped by his credence and perhaps even his purse the young Napoleon to be admitted to the Brienne cadet school."

During his Corsican stay, Boucheporn welcomed home Pierre Baillot (1771–1842), a young violinist and an orphan at the age of twelve of a magistrate in Bastia, and "treated him with all the tenderness of a son." He sent him to Rome with his own children, to study with the musician Pollani, who was himself a student of the violinist and composer Pietro Nardini. Baillot was to become one of the most famous French violinists.

=== An enlightened intendant ===
According to his French biographer, Maurice Bordes, "marked by the philosophy of Enlightenment, economic liberalism and physiocracy, Boucheporn is one of the enlightened intendants of the end of the Ancien Régime."

The British historian Peter Jones highlights that he was one of these intendants who, by their attitude and role, were ahead of their time: "Turgot, Bertier fils, Antoine Chaumont de La Galaizière and Bertrand de Boucheporn were all intendants who became impatient with the stop-go politics of reform. Rather than wait upon events, they pushed on with practical measures hoping to convert ministers along the way. In many respects they were men ahead of their time: advocates of some form of power sharing rather than diligent instruments of traditional absolute monarchy."

As he was newly installed as intendant of Navarre, in southern France, Boucheporn would declare to the parlementaires at Pau: "We no longer live in times when men consider that mode of governance to be perfect which is most complicated and most shrouded in mystery, or which endeavors to distract or altogether to deceive the people."

=== Sentence and death in Toulouse (1794) ===
Under the Terror, as two of his sons had emigrated to serve in the Armée des Princes, Boucheporn was arrested (June 1793) and "tried on a charge of sending money abroad." He was sentenced to death and beheaded on the Place de la Liberté in Toulouse on 2d Ventôse, Year II (20 February 1794), at the age of 53.

Bertrand de Boucheporn was the "9th of 31 victims of the Tribunal Révolutionnaire in Toulouse," and one of nine French intendants to die under the guillotine.

== Coat of arms ==
Armes: Écartelé aux 1 et 4 d'azur à une pomme de pin d'argent tigée et feuillée de même; aux 2 et 3 de gueules à trois annelets entrelacés d'or. The coat of arms of the Bertrand de Boucheporn family are recalled in the blason of the village of Boucheporn, in Moselle, which also features, in the 1st quarter, the blason of the Longeville Abbey, to which the village was attached in the Middle age.
