= Tourny avenues (Périgueux) =

Avenues in Périgueux, France

Tourny alleys
- Schematic drawing of the Allées de Tourny.

- Location within Nouvelle-Aquitaine Location within France
- Former names: Place Tourny (1743–1789); Place de la Liberté, place de l'Union et place de la Réunion (French Revolution)
- Type: Avenue
- Length: 350 m (0.22 mi)
- Width: 70 m (0.043 mi)
- Area: 21,300 m^{2} (229,000 sq ft)
- Tourist routes: Cours Tourny; Monument aux morts
- Location: Périgueux, Nouvelle-Aquitaine, France
- Arrondissement: Centre-ville et Hôpital
- Coordinates: 45°11′12″N 0°43′27″E
- Southeast end: Rue de l'Arsault
- West end: Place Yves-Guéna

Construction
- Construction start: 1743
- Completion: 1748

The Tourny avenues (lit. English for Allées de Tourny) are located in the city center of Périgueux, in the French department of Dordogne.

Their history dates back to the 18th century, when Intendant Louis-Urbain Aubert de Tourny created them between 1743 and 1748. In 1909, the monument to the dead of the Dordogne Mobiles was built in its eastern section, which was renamed "esplanade du Souvenir" in 1997. The allées have been classified as a site of picturesque interest since 1950. Since the 1980s, they have hosted a variety of events.

== Location and access ==
With an average width of 70 meters and a maximum length of 350 meters, the Tourny avenues are trapezoidal in shape, covering an area of 21,300 m2. (Note: pp. –560-562.)

The Tourny avenues begin in the southeast, at the intersection with rue de l'Arsault. Rue Paul-Louis-Courier and Rue du Docteur-Armand-de-Lacrousille follow to the north of the allées. To the west, the avenue leads to Place Yves-Guéna. The cours Tourny runs parallel to the avenues, marking their southern boundary.

== Origins and history ==
In 1483, the Augustinians built their first convent with an enclosure to the north of Périgueux. This convent was destroyed by Protestants in 1575, during their occupation of the city.

On the site of the Place du Plantier, (Note: p. 401.) corresponding to the Vieux Augustins convent enclosure, the Tourny avenues were created between 1743 and 1748 by Intendant Tourny, and were initially called Place Tourny. During the French Revolution, they were given various names: Place de la Liberté, (Note: p. 293.) Place de l'Union (in 1793) (Note: p. 569.) and Place de la Réunion. (Note: p. 435.) In 1861, the boulevard to the south of the avenues was renamed Cours Tourny, while the following year, the road to the north, from the prefecture building to rue de Paris (now avenue Georges-Pompidou), was renamed boulevard Tourny. It wasn't until 1890 that the name Tourny avenues (Allées de Tourny, in French) was coined, designating both the central median and the road to the north (the former Boulevard Tourny).

The square was first planted with elm trees in 1747, followed by medium-leaf elm trees in 1872. In 1787, the first stone benches were installed under the shade of the elms. In 1871, platanus trees replaced the first diseased elms. In 1876, in a turbulent urban context following the construction of the Hôtel de Préfecture a few dozen meters away, a square with a pond was laid out next to the belvedere, before the construction in 1899 of the bandstand, (Note: p. 280.) inaugurated in May 1900, and the boulodrome. In 1900, the western section was planted with horse chestnut trees. The Monument aux morts des mobiles de la Dordogne was erected in 1909, in the eastern part of the allées, and since 1997 has been known as the esplanade du Souvenir. (Note: p. 536.) This imposing monument is the work of sculptor Edmond Desca (1855–1918) and today serves as a memorial to the various wars. (Note: p. 346.)

In 1961, two stone statues of Montaigne and Fénelon, designed by Gilbert Privat, were erected on the avenues. In 1972, the plane trees were replaced. In 1983, the bandstand roof was removed as it had become unsafe. In 1985, fifty-five silver lime trees were planted on the avenues, replacing the elm, lime and platanus trees.

In October 2015, the bandstand renovation project got underway, with students from the CFA building and public works school in the Dordogne undertaking a complete overhaul of the bandstand, including "reconstruction of the columns, roof and even the central chandelier" in Belle Époque style. In early June 2018, the work was completed in time for the bandstand to be used for the Fête de la Musique. In 2022, the bandstand was reproduced on a book of stamps "to celebrate the 40th anniversary of the Fête de la Musique.

In 2020, work was undertaken to turn the Tourny avenues into an interchange station to the north (serving six bus routes) and to make the Cours Tourny safer to the south, with the creation of a forecourt in front of the Museum of Art and Archeology of Périgord, two raised crosswalks and a central pedestrian island facing Rue Limogeanne. The whole complex was scheduled for inauguration in January 2021.

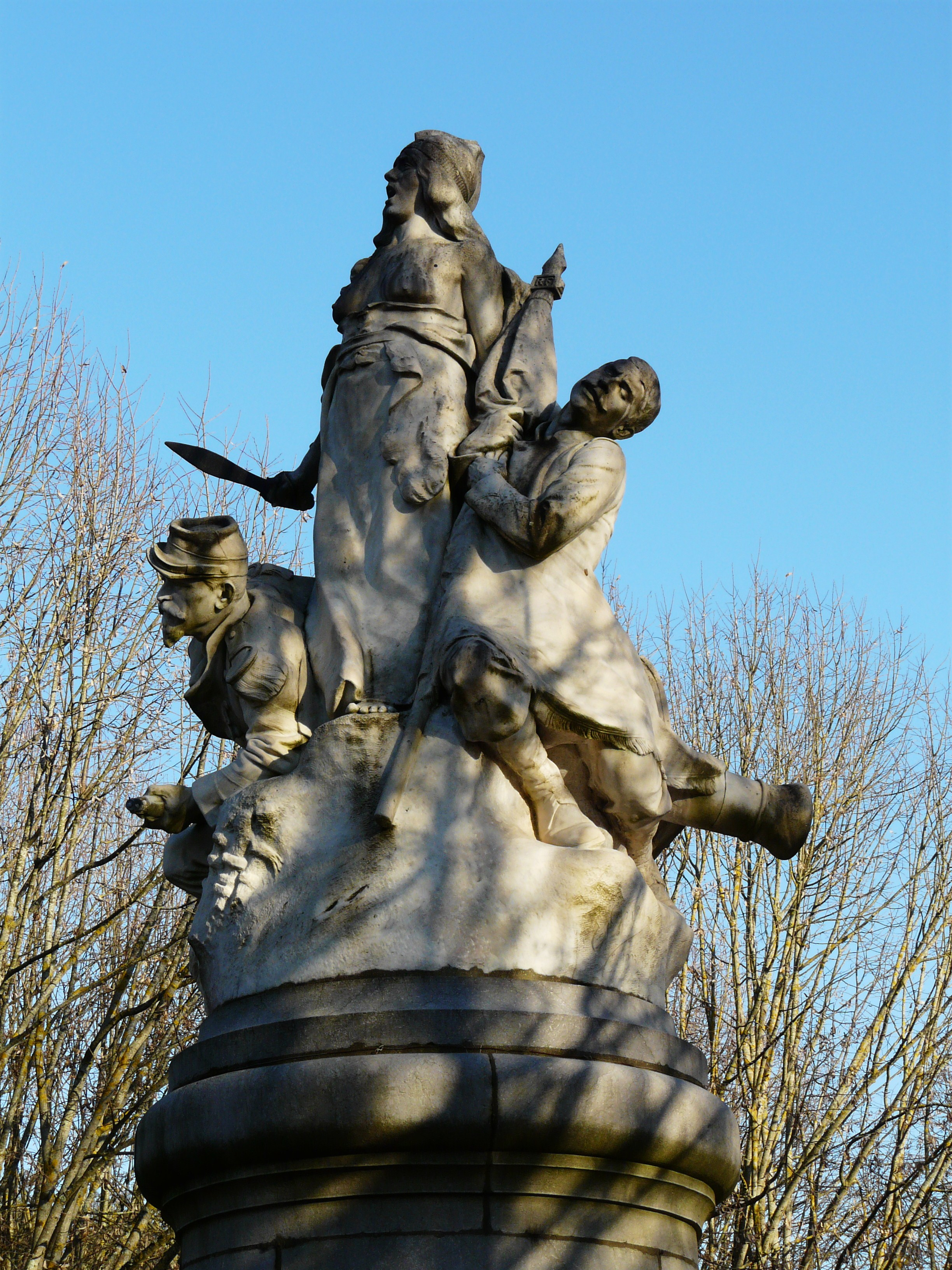
Edmond Desca, Monument aux morts des mobiles de la Dordogne.

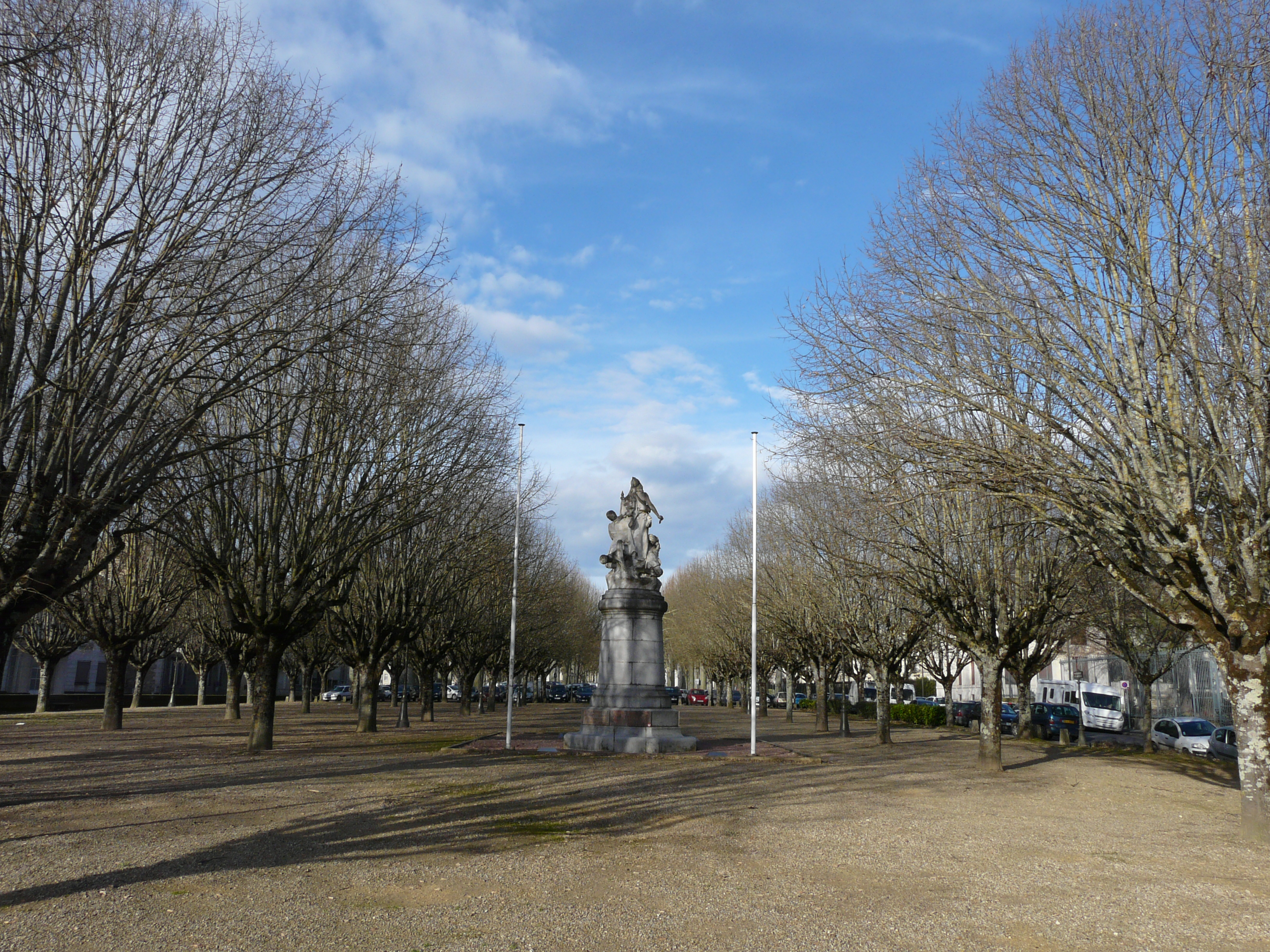
The esplanade du Souvenir.

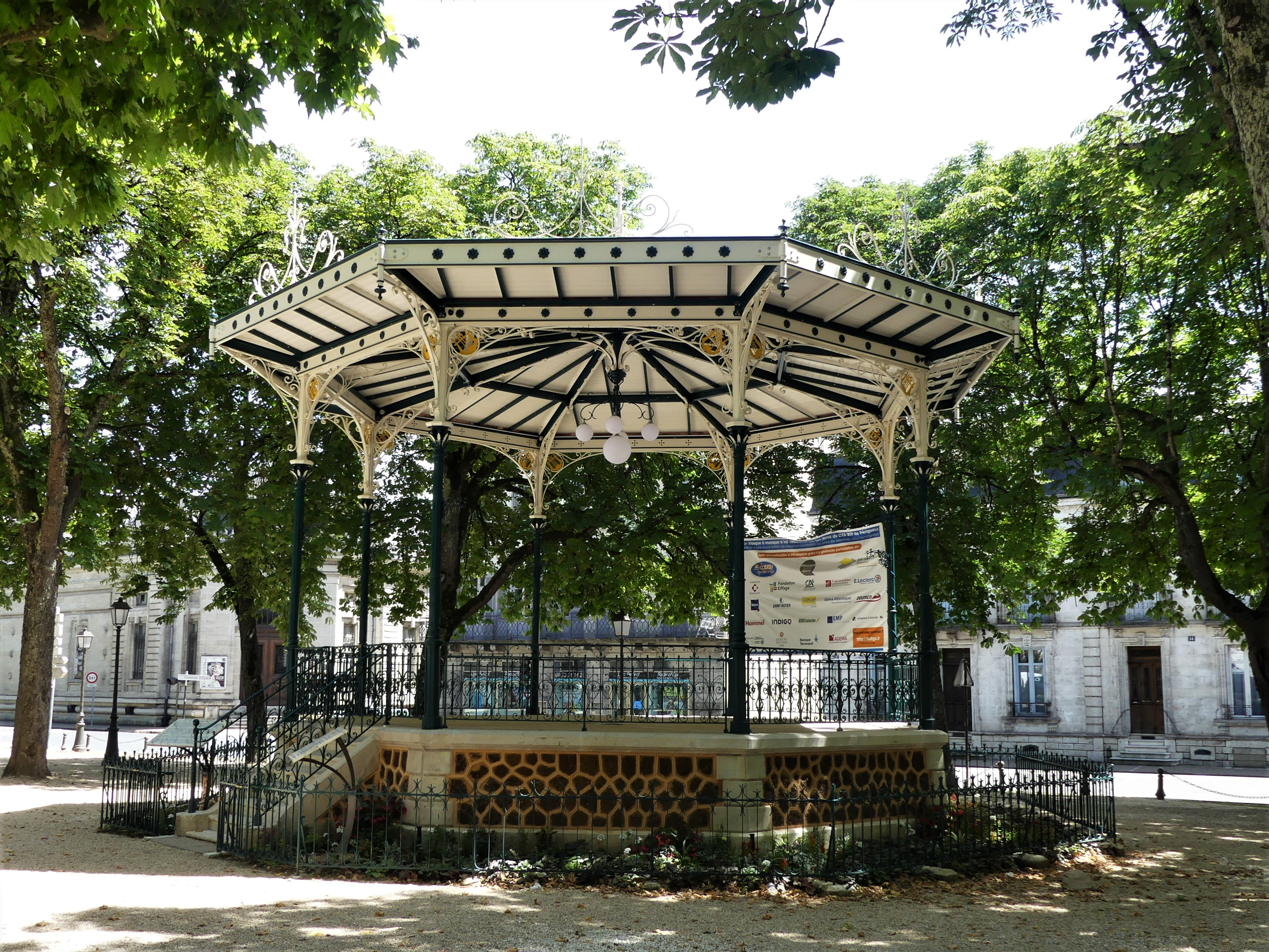
The bandstand, after its renovation in 2018.

=== Popularity and protection ===
Before the 1970s, the Tourny avenues were one of Périgourdins' favorite places for a stroll. Since 21 September 1950, the Tourny avenues have been classified as a site of picturesque interest, to protect the surrounding tree lines and historic monuments.

Since 1971, three-quarters of the central median on the west side have been used as a parking lot, making it impossible to hold the annual Foire de Périgueux, which moved to the Toulon district a few years later, and then to the Marsac-sur-l'Isle exhibition center.

On 20 and 21 September 2014, on the occasion of the European Heritage Days in Périgueux, several tours of the Tourny avenues were held, in this place that "completely changed the city's landscape" according to Martine Balout, the local manager of the French Towns and Lands of Art and History.

== Remarkable buildings and places of remembrance ==
The avenues are surrounded by several remarkable buildings. To the north, the Hôtel de la Division, built in the eighteenth century, whose entrance faces south onto the Tourny avenues, has been open since 1958; (Note: p. 179.) the main façade of the Prefecture building, inaugurated in 1864, overlooks the avenues. In addition, some fifteen townhouses, built from the 1870s onwards, follow one another, including No. 9, listed as a historic monument. To the south, on the Cours Tourny, the Museum of Art and Archeology of Périgord faces the prefecture.

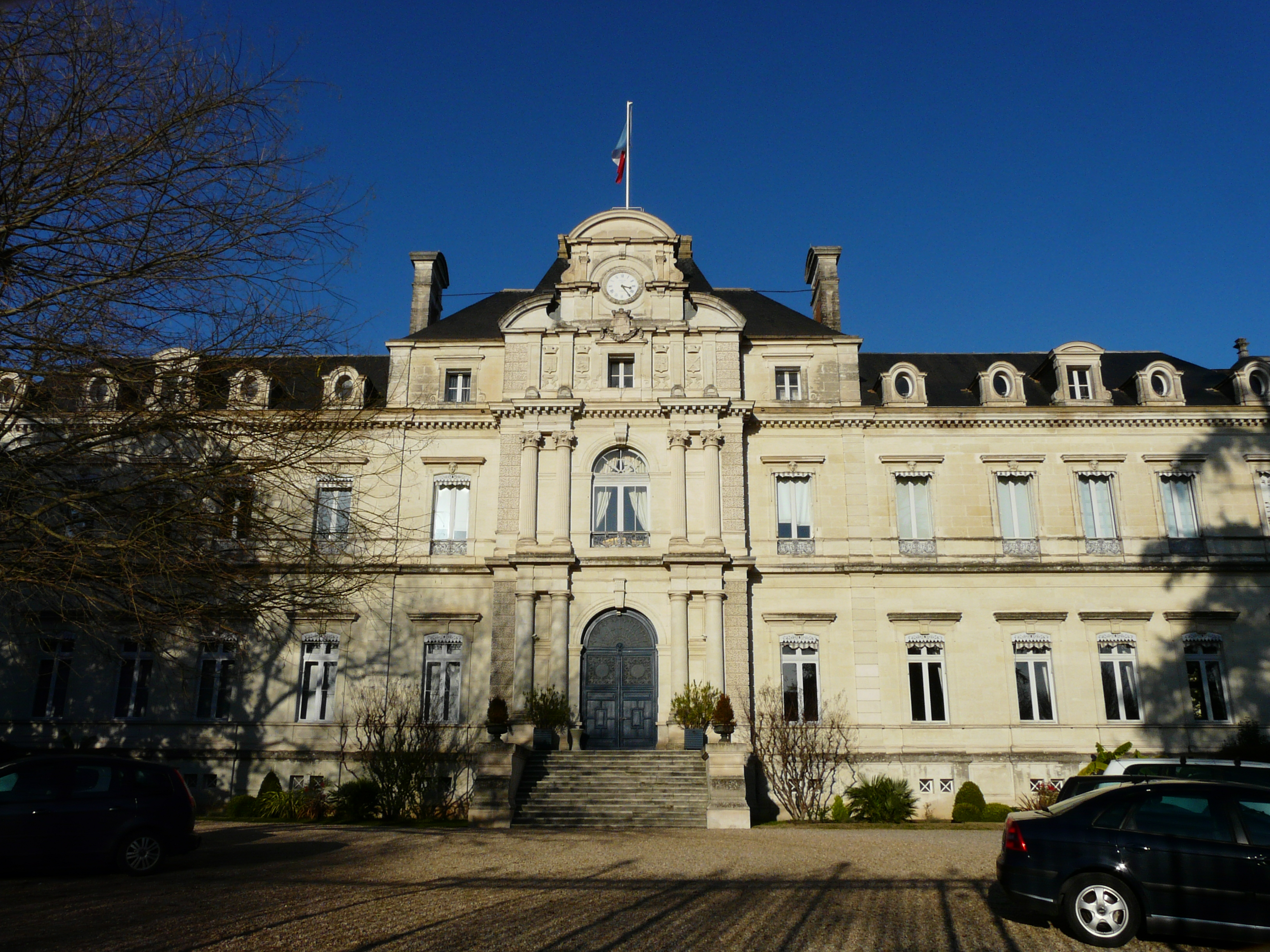
The Dordogne prefecture building.

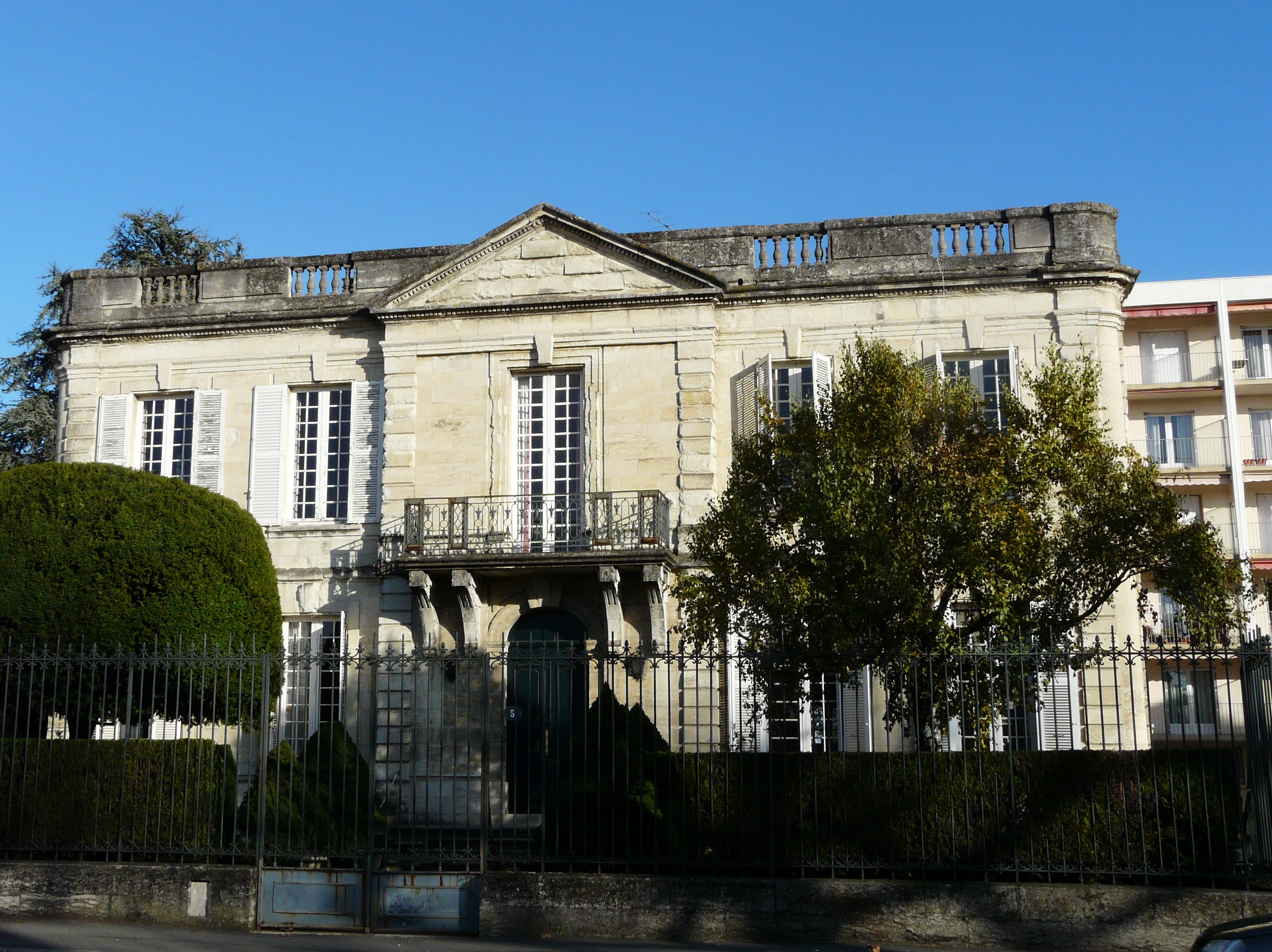
Hôtel de la Division, south facade.

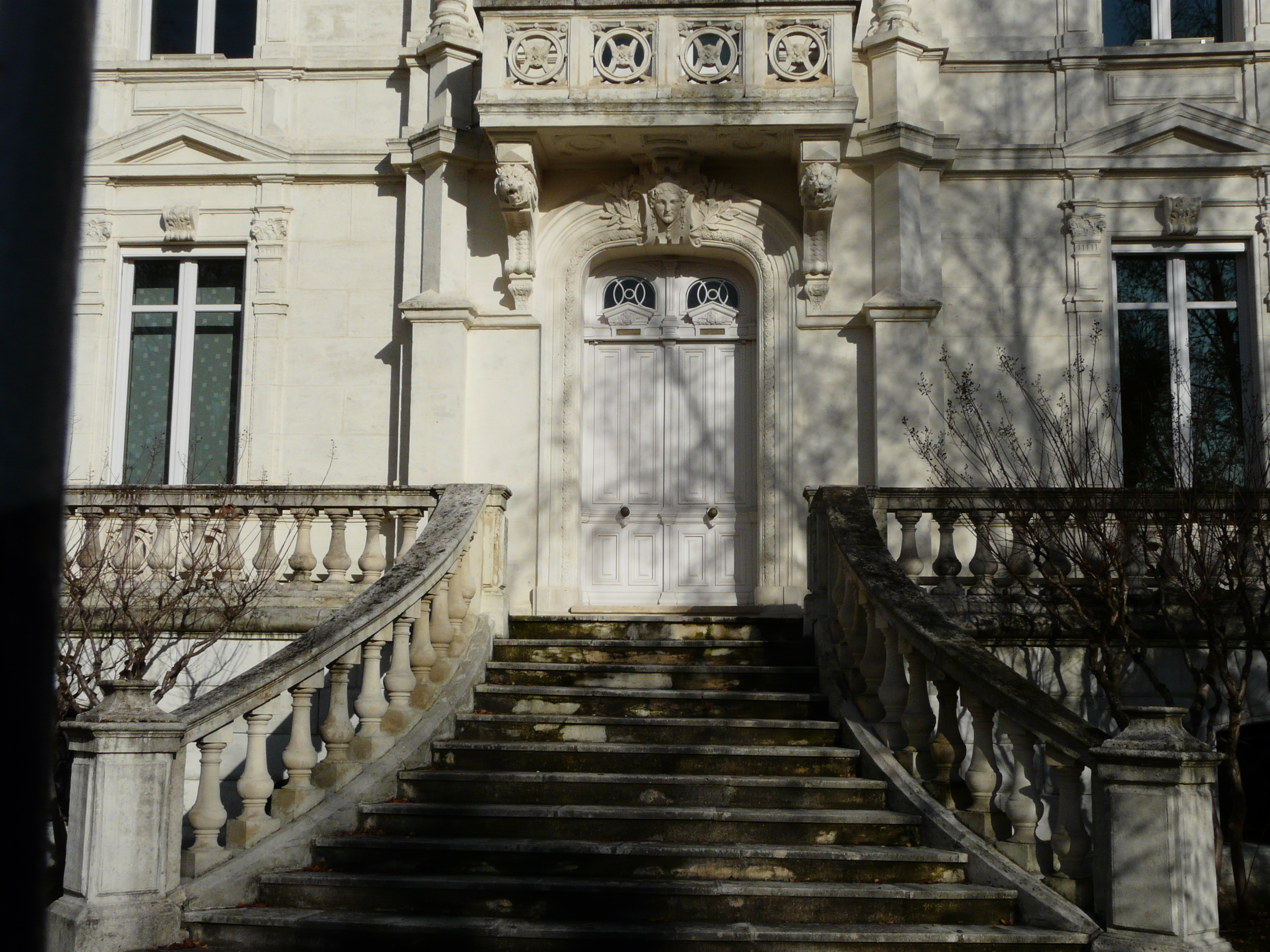
The staircase at No. 7 Tourny avenues.

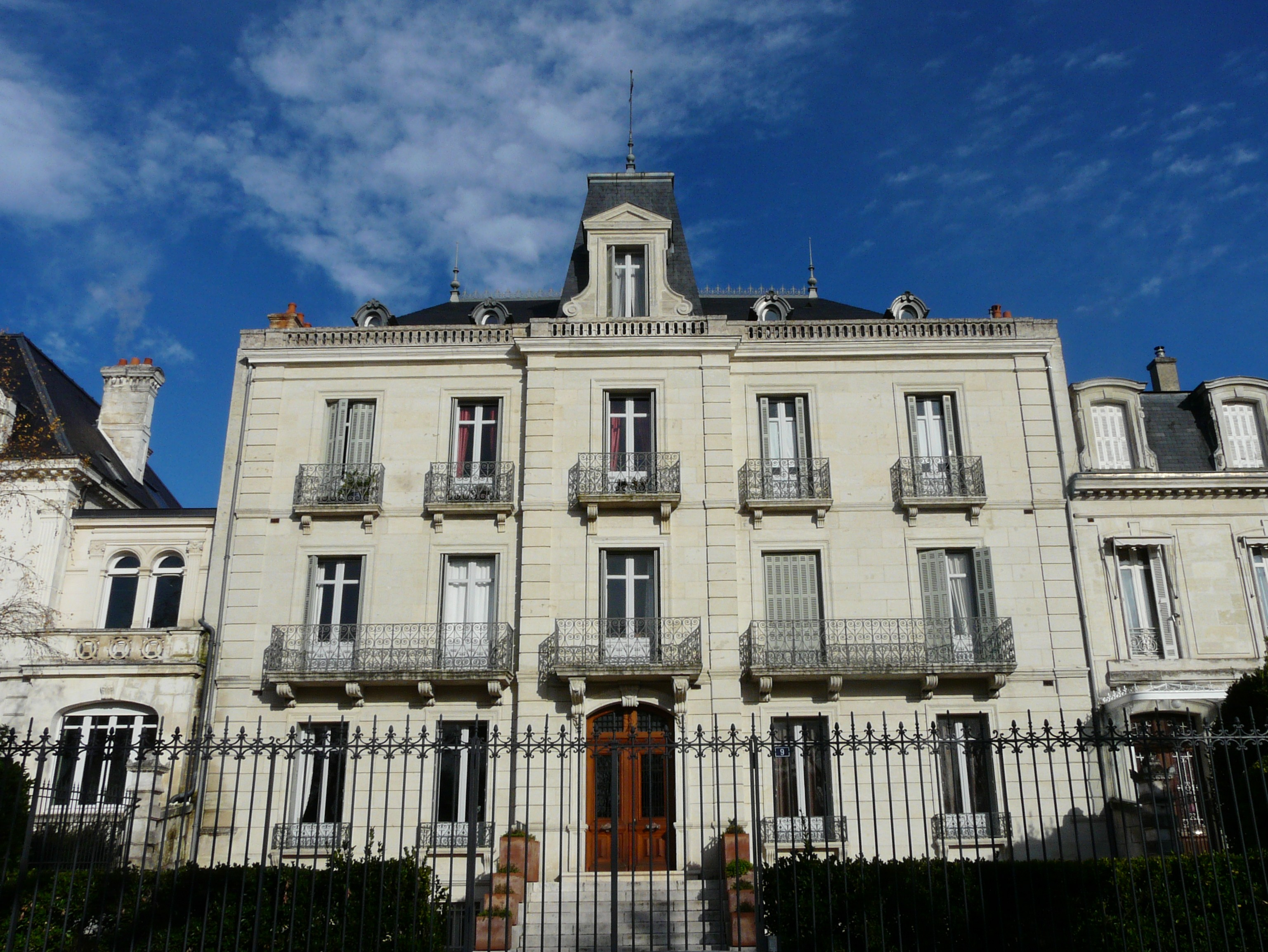
The town house at no. 9, Tourny avenues.

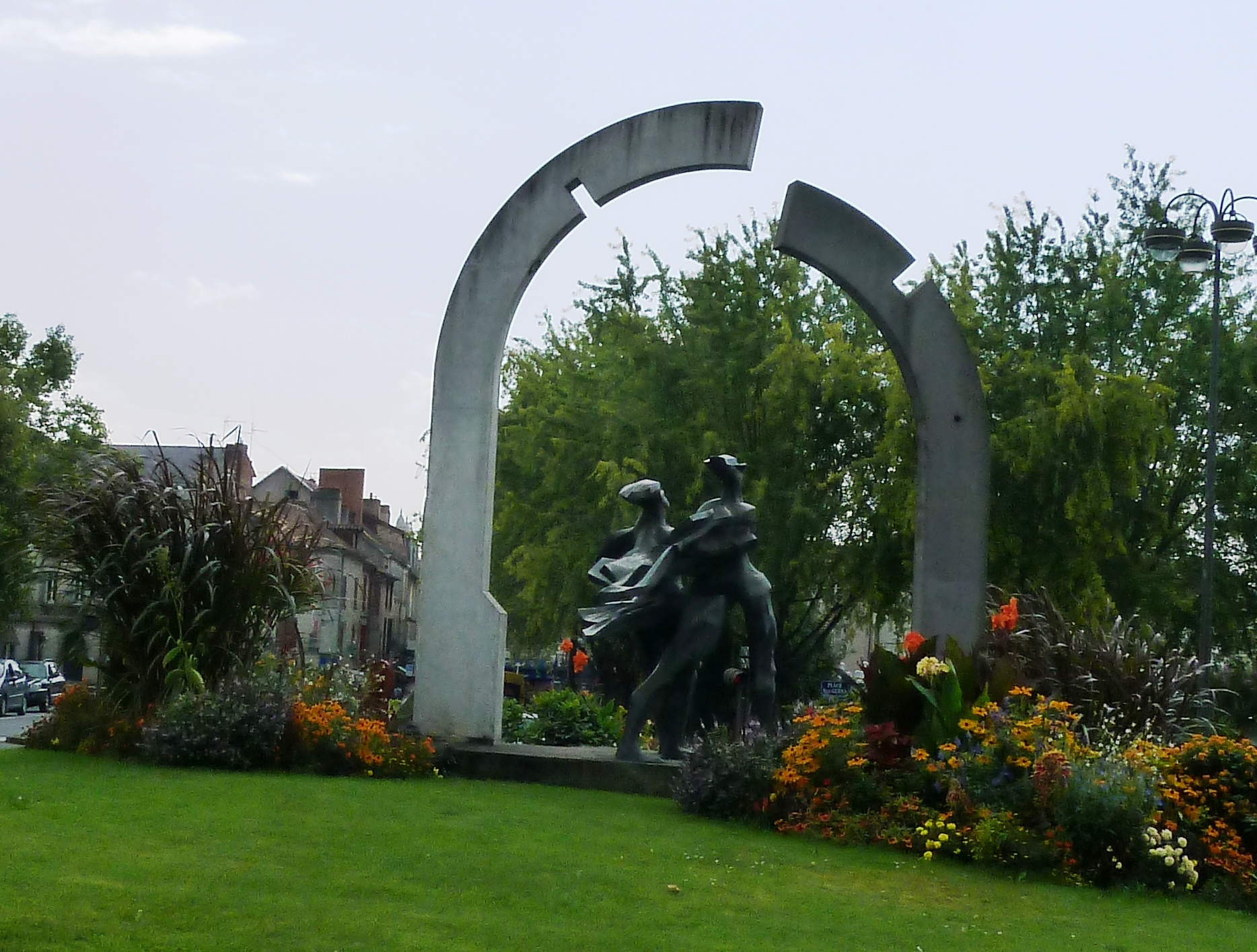
Place Yves-Guéna, seen from the north-northeast.

=== Events ===
This site, on the northern edge of Périgueux's protected area, is the venue for a variety of events. Every year, the Tourny avenues are the starting point for a parade of several hundred riders from the Fédération française des motards en colère, and in April 2012, the Clautre market was moved to the Tourny avenues. Since 2005, in June, the kiosk on the Tourny avenues has hosted the "Fête du slip". Every August since 1983, the "National de pétanque" has attracted thousands of players, some from Africa, America and Asia. However, the 35th edition in 2017 could be the last on the median strip, as work was planned to create 120 additional parking spaces there in 2018, to compensate for the spaces that were to be removed on the Cours Montaigne. A funfair for the Christmas and New Year period sets up every year on the Tourny avenues, in place of the parking lot. At the end of September 2015, the Tourny avenues and Cours Montaigne welcomed 30,000 visitors over three days, according to the town hall, for Péri'Meuh, an "urban agricultural festival". This agricultural festival was repeated in September 2017, and again in 2019. In 2021, this event was not incorporated into the Festival du livre gourmand, much to the disappointment of representatives of the agricultural world, notably the Fédération départementale des syndicats d'exploitants agricoles (FDSEA). Having registered the title "Péri'Meuh", the FDSEA contacted the Sarlat-la-Canéda municipal team, which was then expected to organize the event in September 2022.

== Bibliography ==
Document used as a source for this article:

- Penaud, Guy (2003). Le Grand Livre de Périgueux (in French). Périgueux: éditions la Lauze. ISBN 2-912032-50-4.
