= Paul Alday =

French musician

Jérôme Paul Bonaventure Alday (c.1763 – 1835) was a French violinist, composer and music publisher who spent most of his active career in Dublin, Ireland. He was the only composer in early 19th-century Ireland known to have written symphonies.

== Life ==
Alday was born in Perpignan the part of the province of Roussillon as a member of a musical family that included his father (whose first name is unknown), his elder brother François (c.1761 – after 1835) and the latter's sons Francisque and Ferdinand, all of whom became composers resident in Lyon. In musical reference works, there is considerable confusion regarding the ascription of compositions to either of these four musicians as their names mostly appear as "Alday" only.

Paul Alday studied with Giovanni Battista Viotti in Paris, where he participated as a violinist in the Concerts spirituels between 1783 and 1790. He also published four of his own violin concertos in Paris during these years. He next reappears in Oxford in 1793 when he married the French harpist Adélaïde Rosalie Delatouche. In this city he published three of his string quartets. By 1804, he had moved to Edinburgh.

Still in the same year he is recorded as having performed in Cork and Dublin and then settled in the latter city for the rest of his life. He appeared both as a soloist in violin concertos and as leader of orchestras including the Anacreontic Society (1819–1828), of which he was secretary (1824–1830), and The Sons of Handel. In 1810, Alday took over the music shop of Francis Rhames, moving it to 10 Dame Street in 1815, which he continued until his death in Dublin in 1835. Here, he sold sheet music and musical instruments and also published music under his name.

== Music ==
Alday made a name for himself as a violinist, composer, and successful business man in Irish musical life of the early 19th century. His two Grand Symphonies, one in C major and one in D major, both written around 1819 and performed by the Anacreontic Society in February 1820, are today regarded as the only symphonies written in Ireland in the first half of the 19th century. The Andante movement of the Second Symphony was described as "a production of the first-rate order ... (which) must always be a desideratum to the selection of every lover of instrumental music".

== Selected works ==
=== Orchestral music ===
- Violin Concerto in D major, Op. 2 (Paris, c.1785)
- Violin Concerto in B♭ major (Paris, c.1788)
- Violin Concerto in A major (Paris, c.1788)
- Violin Concerto in D minor (Paris, 1789; also Berlin, c. 1800)
- Concertante Symphony in C major for two violins and orchestra (c.1788; Paris, c.1800)
- Symphony No. 1 in C major (Dublin, c.1819)
- Symphony No. 2 in D major (Dublin, c.1819)

=== Chamber music ===
- Airs variés pour le violon avec accompagnement de basse, two volumes (Paris, 1786 and 1788)
- Trois Duos (E♭ major, G major, G minor), for violin and viola (Paris, not dated)
- Mélanges for two violins (Paris, not dated)
- "God Save the King", with Variations, for two violins (London & Oxford, c.1795)
- A Grand Pastoral Overture, for piano with violin and cello ad lib (London?, c.1795)
- Three string quartets (B♭ major, A major, C minor) (London & Oxford, c.1795)
- Horn Quintet (before 1805), unpublished
- Perche ti lagni mio ..., Polacca (London & Dublin, c.1807), for voice, violin and piano
- A Pocket Volume of Airs, Duets, Songs, Marches etc., for one melodic instrument and piano (Dublin, c.1812)

=== Piano music ===
- The Blue Bells of Scotland, with Variations (Dublin, c.1805), for piano or harp
- A Collection of Favourite Airs etc. with Variations (Dublin, c.1810)
- The Favorite Air of Paddy O'Carrol (Dublin, c.1810)
- The Celebrated Ballad of Sweet Robin (Dublin, c.1810)
- His Excellency the Earl of Whitworth's Grand March and Welcome to Ireland (Dublin, c.1815)
- Installation, Marches, ... Dedicated to ... the Knights of St Patrick (Dublin, c.1815)
- P. Alday's Select Collection of Country Dances (Dublin, 1815, 1820, 1825)
- Alday's Select Collection of Country Dances, Waltzes, Quadrilles etc. (Dublin, annually, 1815–1820)
- Favorite Dances (Dublin, n.d.)

== Bibliography ==
- Ita M. Hogan: Anglo-Irish Music, 1780–1830 (Cork: Cork University Press, 1966).
- entries in modern encyclopaedias: The New Grove Dictionary of Music and Musicians, second edition; Die Musik in Geschichte und Gegenwart (MGG), second edition; The Encyclopaedia of Music in Ireland.
