= Louis-Urbain-Aubert de Tourny =

French administrator

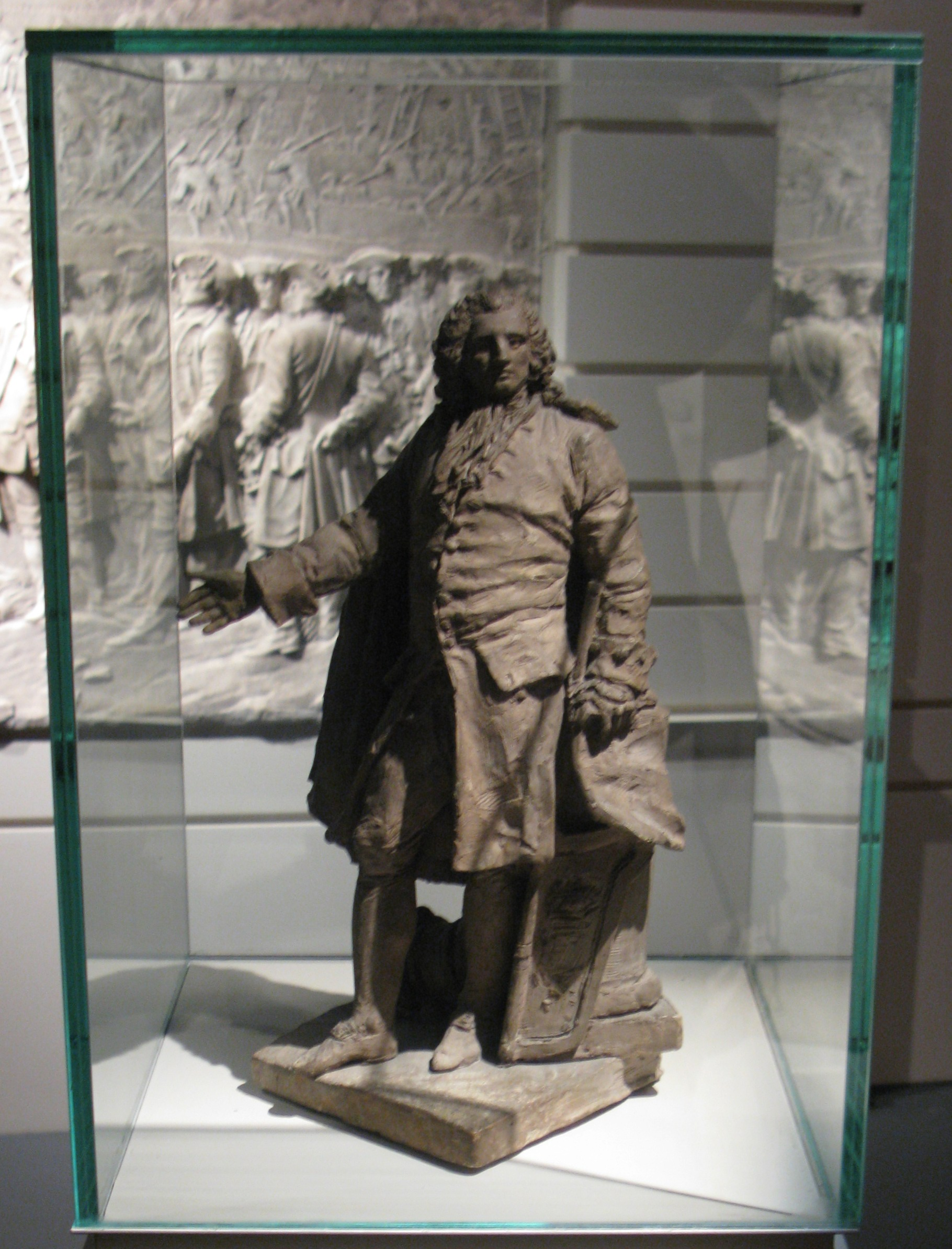
- Louis-Urbain-Aubert de Tourny by Joseph Charles Marin
- Born: May 16, 1695; Les Andelys
- Died: November 28, 1760 (aged 65); Paris
- Occupation: Administrator

Louis-Urbain-Aubert de Tourny (1695, in Les Andelys, Province of Normandy – 1760, in Paris) was a French administrator active in 18th century Bordeaux.

At first maître des requêtes, in 1730 he was made intendant to Limoges. In 1743, he became intendant of Guyenne in Bordeaux. He beautified the quays on the Garonne, adding buildings, opening avenues and creating a public garden. He was made conseiller d'État in 1757.

Baron Haussmann, who spent more than a dozen years in Bordeaux, saw Tourny's work as anticipating his own renovation of Paris.

== See also ==
- Tourny avenues (Périgueux)

== Bibliography ==
- L'intendant Tourny 1695-1760 by Lheritier Michel.
