= Giovanni Battista Viotti =

Italian violinist (1755–1824)

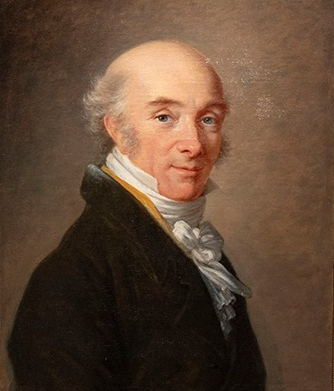
- Portrait of Giovanni Battista Viotti by Louise Élisabeth Vigée Le Brun, 1805
- Born: 12 May 1755; Fontanetto Po, Piemonte, Kingdom of Sardinia
- Died: 3 March 1824 (aged 68); London, England
- Occupations: Violinist; Composer

Giovanni Battista Viotti (12 May 1755 – 3 March 1824) was an Italian violinist whose virtuosity was famed and whose work as a composer featured a prominent violin and an appealing lyrical tunefulness. He was also a director of French and Italian opera companies in Paris and London. He personally knew Joseph Haydn and Ludwig van Beethoven.

== Biography ==
Viotti was born at Fontanetto Po in the Kingdom of Sardinia (today in the province of Vercelli, Piedmont, Italy). For his musical talent, he was taken into the household of principe Alfonso dal Pozzo della Cisterna in Turin, where he received a musical education that prepared him to be a pupil of Gaetano Pugnani. He served at the Savoia court in Turin, 1773–80, then toured as a soloist, at first with Pugnani, before going to Paris alone, where he made his début at the Concert Spirituel, 17 March 1782. He was an instant sensation and served for a time at Versailles before founding a new opera house, the Théâtre de Monsieur in 1788, under the patronage of Louis-Stanislas-Xavier, comte de Provence, the king's brother, whose court title was Monsieur. There he mounted operas of his friend Luigi Cherubini, among lesser lights. When the French Revolution took a radical turn and, though his opera house was renamed the Théâtre Feydeau, former royal connections became a dangerous liability, he moved in 1792 to London, making his début at Johann Peter Salomon's Hanover Square Concert, 7 February 1793. In London he went from success to success, as a featured violinist for Salomon's concert series, 1793–1794; as musical director of the new Opera Concerts in 1795; as a star in the benefit concerts for Haydn, 1794 and 1795; as acting manager of Italian opera at the King's Theatre, 1794–1795; and as leader and director of the orchestra, 1797. He was invited to perform in the houses of the London bon ton, including for the Prince of Wales.

Then, with Britain at war with Revolutionary France, he was ordered to leave the country, under suspicion of Jacobin sympathies. Period papers hint at an intrigue in the favour of Viotti's rival, Wilhelm Cramer, who had led the Opera House orchestra before Viotti took over. The Morning Post and Gazetteer in its issue of Friday, 9 March 1798, reported that "the Duke of L... and the Earl of C... have been particularly active in entreating his Majesty to order Viotti out of the kingdom". This may refer to Francis Osborne, 5th Duke of Leeds, and to Philip Stanhope, 5th Earl of Chesterfield. Pierre Rode, Viotti's favourite pupil, was expelled from England, too, and may have left the country some days previous to Viotti who awaited the outcome of his case, after several gentlemen and even Princess Elizabeth spoke in his favour. But finally, Viotti left England with a packet ship on 8 March 1798. He lived on the estate of a rich English merchant, John Smith, in Schenefeld (Pinneberg) near Hamburg from ca. March 1798 to ca. July 1799. Between March and May 1798 he gave private lessons to the 13-year-old virtuoso Friedrich Wilhelm Pixis. After that, according to two papers issued in February 1800, he seems to have lived incognito on the estate of his English friends, William and Margaret Chinnery, at Gillwell House, where he lived officially from 1801; according to another paper he was still in Schenefeld in April 1800. He gave up giving concerts to run a wine business, but used to play in private concerts. In July 1811, he became a naturalised British citizen, after his friend, the Duke of Cambridge, a younger brother of the Prince of Wales, had interceded on his behalf. In 1813, he was one of the founders of the Philharmonic Society of London. Viotti didn't perform as a soloist anymore but as orchestra leader and chamber musician. After his wine business failed, he returned to Paris to work as director of the Académie Royale de Musique, from 1819 to 1821. He returned to London in November 1823 together with Margaret Chinnery and died in her presence on 3 March 1824.

== Music ==
In spite of his few direct pupils, Viotti was a very influential violinist. The teacher of both Pierre Rode and Pierre Baillot and an important influence on Rodolphe Kreutzer, all of whom became notable teachers themselves, he is considered the founding father of the 19th-century French violin school. He also taught Paul Alday and August Duranowski, who was an influence on Niccolò Paganini.

Viotti owned a violin fabricated by Antonio Stradivari in 1709 that would eventually become known as the Viotti Stradivarius. He is also thought to have commissioned the construction of at least one replica of this violin. The Viotti ex-Bruce, renamed in honour of its previous owner, was purchased by the Royal Academy of Music in September 2005. Funding was provided by HM Government in lieu of Inheritance Tax, and by the National Art Collections Fund, the National Heritage Memorial Fund and many private donors. The instrument was to be displayed in the York Gate Collections, the academy's free museum and research centre. The Viotti ex-Bruce is to be heard as well as seen: the instrument is to be played sparingly, under very controlled circumstances, at research events and occasional performances elsewhere.

Viotti's most notable compositions are his 29 violin concertos, which were an influence on Ludwig van Beethoven. One in particular, No. 22 in A minor (1792), is still very frequently performed, especially by advanced student players. The other concertos are of similar quality but lesser known. Other notable concertos include: No. 23 in G major (1792). During the decade of 1990–2000, Guido Rimonda found three more concertos. However, these discoveries – that can be regarded as concertos No. 30, 31 and 32 – are incomplete, since only two movements were found for each concerto. Most likely they are the unpublished concertos mentioned by Viotti himself in his will left in favour of Mrs. Chinnery who cared for him in London, in the last years of his life.

In 2005, violinist Franco Mezzena released a complete set on the Dynamic label. Since 2012 Guido Rimonda started releasing Viotti's 32 concertos for Decca Universal Group label. This project will be completed by the end of 2023. In the meantime, in 2021, Guido Rimonda started the first publishing of Viotti's complete scores of violin concertos for Edizioni Curci Milan.

Viotti's music generally features the violin prominently. Most of his string quartets largely ignore the balanced texture pioneered by Haydn, giving a "solo" role to the first violin and as such may be considered Quatuors brillants. However, his Tre Quartetti Concertanti, G.112, 113 and 114 (after Remo Giazotto who catalogued Viotti's works), composed in 1815 and published in Paris in 1817, are true concertante works offering extensive solos for each instrument and not just the first violin. Viotti often wrote chamber music for more traditional combinations such as two violins and cello. The Opp. 18 and 19 are perhaps the best known of these and are still in print today. He also wrote sonatas, songs, and other works.

The Italian violinist Guido Rimonda has pointed out in 2013 that the incipit of his "Tema e variazioni in Do maggiore" has a very strong resemblance to the French hymn La Marseillaise. This incipit was first thought to have been published before La Marseillaise, but it appeared to be a misconception as Viotti published several variations of "La Marseillaise" in 1795 and wrote as a note "I have never composed the quartets below" (Je n'ai jamais composé les quatuors ci dessous).

== Cultural references ==
Viotti is commemorated annually in the Viotti International Music Competition near his birthplace in Vercelli, Italy. In the same city takes place also the Viotti Festival - International Music Festival - an event that is part of the circuit "Piemonte dal Vivo" Italy.

== Bibliography ==
- Arthur Pougin, Viotti et l’école moderne de Violon, Paris, Schott, 1888. Viotti et l'ecole moderne de violon
- Marc Pincherle, La Méthode de violon de J. B. Viotti, in Feuillets d'histoire du violon, Paris, Legouix, 1927, pp. 172–181
- Remo Giazotto, Giovan Battista Viotti, Milan, Curci, 1956
- Boris Schwarz, Viotti — eine Neubewertung seiner Werke, in V. Schwarz (editor), Violinspiel und Violinmusik in Geschichte und Gegenwart, Vienna, Universal Edition, 1975, pp. 41–46
- Warwick Lister, Amico: the life of Giovanni Battista Viotti, New York, Oxford University Press, 2009
- Philippe Borer, The chromatic scale in the compositions of Viotti and Paganini, a turning point in violin playing and writing for strings, in Nicolò Paganini Diabolus in Musica, ed. by A. Barizza and F. Morabito, Turnhout, 2010, pp. 91–120
- Mariateresa Dellaborra (editor), Giovanni Battista Viotti «professione musicista», sguardo sull’opera, lo stile, le fonti, Roma, Società Editrice di Musicologia, 2017
