= Giulio Viotti =

Italian painter (1845–1877)

Giulio Viotti (Casale Monferrato, Alessandria, 1845-Turin, 1877) was an Italian painter, mainly of orientalist and historic subjects.

After first studying law, he turned to art, studying at the Accademia Albertina in Turin. he then went to Rome where he was a pupil of Andrea Castaldi. He was influenced by Mariano Fortuny the painter. In 1873, he won a medal in Vienna. A list of works include the Varallo Sesia (1873), the Portrait of Ferdinando Rossaro (1870), and for a painting of the Feminine Figure (1873). He frequented with the painters of the School of Rivara. He did participate in the fresco decoration of the Sanctuary of Belmonte, in Canavese.
