= List of governors in the viceroyalty of the Río de la Plata =

Governors in the various provinces of the viceroyalty of Río de la Plata.

In addition to governors, the following list (under construction) intends to give an overview of colonial units of that echelon. It also includes some offices of similar rank, especially the intendant. Intendente is both a Spanish and Portuguese word, derived from the French intendant. It was introduced to the Spanish monarchy by the Bourbon dynasty, which Spain shared with France after the early 18th century.

== Viceroyalty of Rio de la Plata ==
The Bolivian part:

- 1538 – 1545 Spanish colonize area called Charcas, Upper Peru or Chuquisaca.
- 3 January 1548 Part of Viceroyalty of Peru.
- 1559 Real Audiencia of Charcas created to administer Upper Peru.
- 8 August 1776 Part of Viceroyalty of Río de la Plata (see Argentina).
- 16 July 1809 – November 1809 Independent state proclaimed in Upper Peru nominally in the name of the Bourbon king Ferdinand VII of Spain, who had been deposed by Napoleon.
- 1811 – 1816 Proclaimed a province of Río de la Plata (see Argentina).
- 1816 Re-incorporated into Peru.
- 11 August 1825 Bolivian Republic (initially styled República Bolívar).

=== Cochabamba ===
- 1783 Intendencia of Cochabamba (part of Río de la Plata).
- 1810 End of Spanish rule.
- 1825 Part of Bolivia.

==== Intendants ====
- 1783 – 1785 José de Ayarga
- 1785 – 1809 Francisco de Viedma y Verdejo
- 1809 – 1810 José González de Prada

=== Córdoba ===
- 1783 Intendencia of Córdoba (part of Río de la Plata).
- 1810 End of Spanish rule.
- 1825 Part of Bolivia.

==== Intendants ====
- 1783 – 1797 Rafael de Sobremonte Núñez Castillo Angulo y Bullón Ramírez de Arellano, marqués de Sobremonte
- 1797 – 1803 Nicolás Pérez del Viso
- 1803 – 1805 José González
- 1805 – 1807 Victoriano Rodríguez
- 1807 – 1810 José Gutierrez de la Concha

=== La Paz ===
- 1783 Intendencia of La Paz (part of Río de la Plata).
- 1811 Annexed to Peru.
- 12 July 1809 – 30 September 1809 Under the Revolutionary Junta of Upper Peru (see above)
- January 1811 – July 1811 Argentine occupation.
- 1825 Part of Bolivia.

==== Intendants ====
- 1784 – 1789 José Sebastián de Segurola y Oliden
- 1789 – 1790 José Pablo Conti
- 1790 – 1791 Augustín de Goyoneta
- 1791 – 1793 Juan Manuel Álvarez
- 1793 – 1794 Francisco Antonio Dionisio Cuéllar Artucho Carrillo de los Ríos Ronsvi Valdés
- 1795 – 1796 Fernando de la Sota Agüero
- 1797 – 1805 Juan Antonio de Burgunyó
- 1805 – 12 July 1809 Tadeo Dávila
- 12 July 1809 – 30 September 1809 the Revolutionary Junta of Upper Peru
- 30 September 1809 – 1810 Juan Ramíerz Orosco (b. 1764 – d. c.1823)
- 1810 – 1813 Domingo Tristán y Moscoso
- Jan 1811 – July 1811 Castelli
- 1813 – 1814 Gregorio Hoyos de Miranda García de Llano, marqués de Valde Hoyos
- 1814 – 1816 José María Laudavere
- 1816 – 1817 Mariano Ricafort Palacín y Abarca
- 1817 – 1822 Juan Sánchez Lima
- 1822 – 1823 Francisco Huarte y Jáuregui
- 1823 – 1825 José Ildefonso Mendizábal e Imaz

=== Potosí ===
- 1783 Intendencia of Potosí (part of Río de la Plata).
- 1811 Annexed to Peru.
- 25 November 1811 – 20 September 1811 Argentine occupation.
- May 1813 – December 1813 Argentine occupation.
- May 1815 – December 1815 Argentine occupation.
- 1825 Part of Bolivia.

==== Indendants ====
- 1783 – 1789 Juan del Pino Manrique de Lara
- 1789 – 1810 Francisco de Paula Sanz (d. 1810)
- 25 November 1810 – 1811 Castelli
- 1811 – 20 September 1811 Juan Martín de Pueyrredón (b. 1777 – d. 1850)
- 20 September 1811 – May 1813 José Manuel de Goyeneche y Barreda, Conde de Guaqui
- May 1813 – December 1813 Manuel Belgrano (b. 1770 – d. 1820)
- December 1813 – April 1815 Joaquín de la Pezuela, marqués de Viluma
- April 1815 – July 1815 Juan Rondeau (b. 1775 – d. 1844)

== Sources and references ==
- WorldStatesmen — see each present country

== See also ==
- People of colonial Argentina
- Viceroyalty of the Río de la Plata topics
- Viceroys of the Río de la Plata
