= Nicolas-François Dupré de Saint-Maur =

Nicolas-François Dupré de Saint-Maur (1695, Paris – 30 November 1774) was a French economist and statistician.

== Biography ==
From a family of jurists and financial figures, he was the son of a correcteur in the Chambre des comptes and cousin of Jean-Baptiste-Henri de Valincour. He became treasurer of France at the Bureau de la généralité de Paris and was made a conseiller du roi.

== Works ==
- Le Paradis perdu de Milton. Poème heroique, traduit de l'anglois, avec les remarques de Mr. Addisson (1729) (3 volumes) - a prose translation of Paradise Lost and Paradise Regained by the English poet John Milton, this work was first published by Saint-Maur and was often reissued. Though his authorship of it is uncertain, it was doubtless the reason for his election to the Académie française four years later, in 1733.
- Essai sur les monnaies, ou réflexions sur le rapport entre l'argent et les denrées (1746) Online extracts : - A treatment of European coinage and relationships between the price of wheat, wine, oil, meat, wood and other commodities and salaries paid from 1002 to 1742. It also tried to demonstrate that food prices had increased twelvefold since AD 1 and was one of the first works to introduce John Locke's ideas into France. Adam Smith praised its food-price statistics in his Wealth of Nations and Buffon used its mortality statistics in his Histoire naturelle de l'homme.
- Recherches sur la valeur des monnoies et sur le prix des grains avant et après le concile de Francfort (1762)
- Mémoire sur la décadence du commerce de Bayonne et Saint-Jean-de-Luz, et sur les moyens de le rétablir (1783)
- Mémoire important sur l'administration des corvées dans la généralité de Guyenne, et observations sur les rémontrances du Parlement de Bordeaux (1784)
