= Viotti Festival =

The Viotti International Music Festival was founded in 1997 in the town of Vercelli, after the discovery of unpublished compositions by Giovanni Battista Viotti. Concerts are held at the Basilica of Saint Andrew, the Civic Theater and the Church of Saint Christopher in Vercelli.

The festival has featured soloists included Uto Ughi, Salvatore Accardo, Cecilia Gasdia, Vladimir Spivakov, Maxence Larrieu, Katia Ricciarelli, Ruggiero Ricci, Shlomo Mintz, Luciana Serra, Mischa Maisky.

== International festivals ==
In response to international calls Viotti Festivals have been organized elsewhere in the world:

- 2005, Johannesburg and Pretoria, South Africa, via the ambassador of Italy in Pretoria
- 2005 and 2006, Miami and Orlando, Florida
- 2009, The Villages, Florida
