= Antoine-Martin Chaumont de La Galaizière =

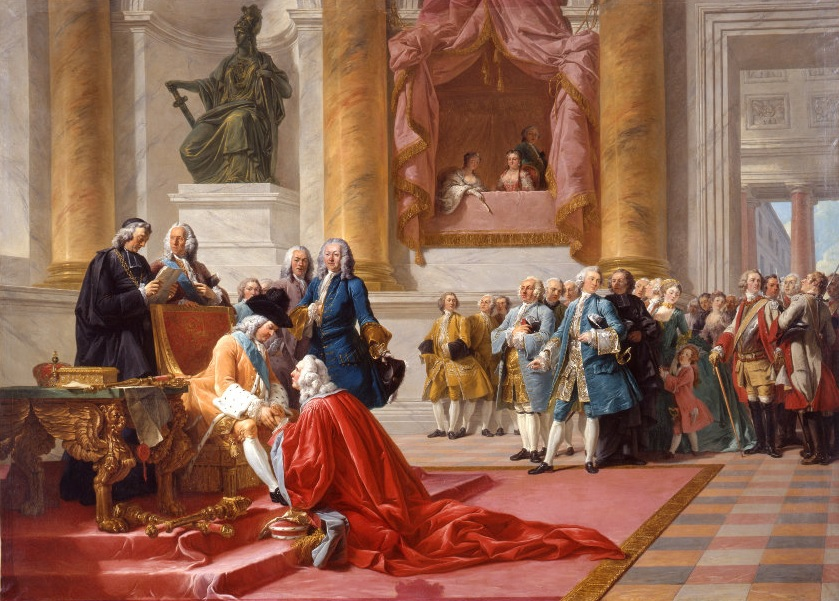
François-André Vincent, The marquis de La Galaizière made chancellor of Lorraine at the château de Meudon by Stanisław Leszczyński on 18 January 1737, 1778. Nancy, Musée Lorrain.

Antoine-Martin Chaumont de La Galaizière (22 January 1697, Namur - 3 October 1783, Paris), marquis de La Galaizière, chancellor of Lorraine, was a French nobleman active at the court of Lorraine. He was one of the lovers of Marie Françoise Catherine de Beauvau-Craon.

== Sources ==
- Pierre Boyé: Le chancelier Chaumont de La Galaizière et sa famille, Nancy: Ed. du Pays lorrain, 1939, 115 p.
- Alfred Brossel: Antoine-Martin de Chaumont, marquis de La Galaizière, intendant de Lorraine, chancelier de Stanislas, 1967-1783, Nancy: G. Thomas, 1968, 38 p.
