= French Poll Tax of 1695 =

Declaration of the King for the establishment of the poll tax

Louis XIV, King of France
- Long title: Declaration du Roy pour l'etablissement de la capitation, avec le tarif contenant la distribution des vingt-deux classes donné a Versailles le 18. Janvier 1695.
- Territorial extent: Kingdom of France: pays d'états, pays d'élection, pays d'imposition
- Enacted by: The King
- Enacted: 18 January 1695, with amendments by the Royal Council of Finances 12 February 1695, 26 February 26, 1695, 31 January 1696.
- Signed by: Louis XVI; Phélypeaux
- Commenced: January 1, 1695
- Date of expiry: 1 April 1698
- Repealed: 20 September 1697
- Status: Repealed

The French Poll Tax of 1695 was established by King Louis XIV in order to finance the War of the League of Augsburg. The traditional methods of war financing had been exhausted. Vauban and Chamlay favoured taxation of the rich and privileged. Yet Pontchartrain refused to propose any measures beyond the traditional. But Basville took the initiative to a poll tax plan, and circumvented the inner circles in Paris by having it formally presented to the King by the Estates of Languedoc. As a universal tax on persons, the poll tax affected all of the three estates in all the provinces of France. Exceptions were only made for members of the mendicant orders and for the poor certified by the priest, and for those who would pay less than 2 livres in poll tax. The taxpayers were divided into twenty-two classes. Members of each class paid a fixed sum of tax. Inclusion in each class was determined not by wealth, but by rank and status. The clergy paid a lump sum of 4 million livres per year instead of being individually taxed. French historians have studied the social implications of the classifications in the schedule to the poll tax decree. Bluche and Solnon maintain that the poll tax schedule constitutes a veritable social hierarchy of France. Guery rejects that the schedule to the poll tax corresponds to a social hierarchy.

== Background ==
France had been engaged in the War of the League of Augsburg since 1688 and in 1694 no peace was in sight. To meet military expenditure, the Controller-General of Finances, Louis Phélypeaux de Pontchartrain, and his predecessor had already implemented the traditional measurers of war financing; raising the Taille and the contract of the Ferme générale, obliged the privileged estates to contribute to the treasury, created and sold countless government positions and debased the currency. But these measures did not make it possible to cover the war expenditures. In 1693, they amounted to 180 million livres while the net revenue of the government after deducting the costs of collection only was 108 million livres. An increase in the taxes of the common people was not an option after the great famine of 1693-1694. In the inner circle around the King, thought began to be given to the creation of a new tax to which the rich and privileged would contribute. This was the basis of the poll tax of 1695.

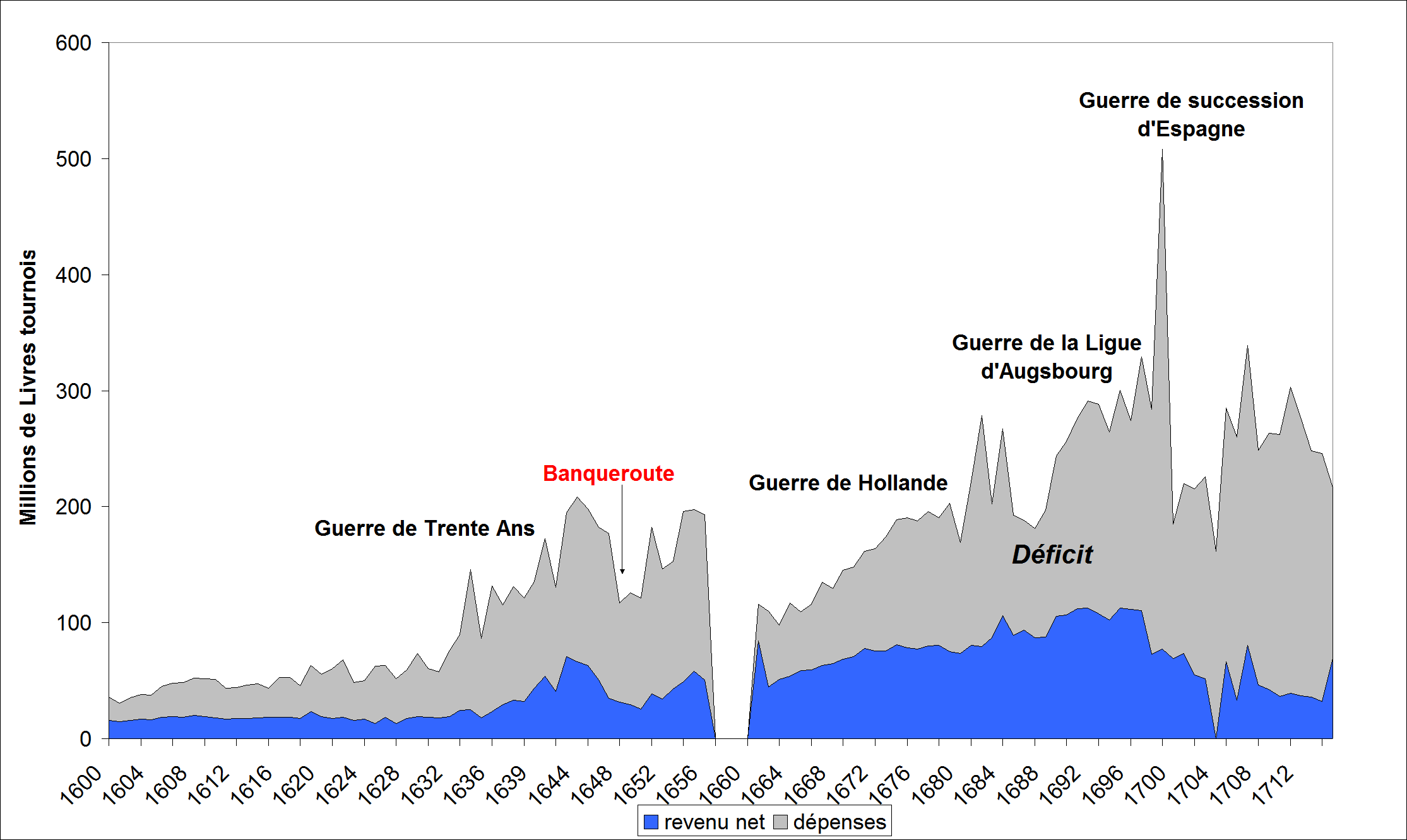
State budget deficits in France, 1600-1712.

Vauban, the Commissioner General of Fortifications, proposed in 1694 to establish a progressive tax which would affect all subjects in a position to pay it and which would be established on the basis of 1/15 of all their income. The Quartermaster-General Chamlay was well aware that France's ability to wage war depended on the government's capacity to mobilize its financial resources. Inspired by Vauban, Chamlay summarized six different solutions extending the tax base to the privileged strata of the society. The first, which was finally implemented through the poll tax of 1695, consisted in classifying individuals into categories, "taxing them according to their status, their official positions and their professions and making the heads of families pay for women, infants and servants". The second was a variant of the first, which taxed not only the head of the family, but also the other members of his household. The third proposal was easier to implement, but would bring in less money and only affect cities. It would be a question of charging a certain sum to each house, whether in the cities or in the main towns, the sum being proportional to the rents. The fourth option was to levy an annual tithe on all rentier property. But, here again, the product would be mediocre, because the bourgeois, craftsmen and merchants whose goods were in paper or silver, would be exempted from it. If this was to be remedied, they would have to be compelled to disclose their business secrets, which would cause them harm and ruin. The fifth proposal was inspired by Holland and England, since it involved increasing taxes on beverages, foodstuffs and goods (except grain) throughout the kingdom. But this increase would be very unpopular, because it would affect the poor as much as the rich. The last way would be to charge the intendants of each généralité to levy a tax on each city and on the nobility, taking into account the means and income of each.

Pontchartrain refused, however, to propose any measures beyond the traditional. But the intendant Nicolas de Basville of Languedoc took the initiative to a poll tax plan, and circumvented the inner circles in Paris by having it formally presented to the King by the Estates of Languedoc. In their deliberation of December 10, 1694, they declared: “The assembly takes the liberty of proposing to His Majesty that it pleases him to make a general subsidy or poll tax which shall be borne by all his subjects. Considering that there is no more certain way to support government expenditures than this type of impost which will be fixed and certain during the course of the war, and being shared by all of His Majesty's subjects, each according to his strength, will furnish abundant relief and maintaining the honour and peace of the State without being a burden on the individuals”. Pontchartrain resisted the measure, but necessity forced him to give in when the financiers declared that they would not give any more credits unless the financial affairs of the State were in order.

== Poll Tax of 1695 ==
As a universal tax on persons, the poll tax affected all of the three estates - the clergy, the nobility and the third estate - in all the provinces of France - whether countries of estates, countries of elections or conquered countries. No distinctions would be made between clergy and laity, noble and commoners, military and civilian, privileged and unprivileged, citizens of the free cities and burghers of the small towns, all must contribute. Exceptions were only made for members of the mendicant orders, for the poor certified by the parish priest and for those who would pay less than 2 livres in poll tax. The taxpayers were divided into twenty-two classes. Members of each class paid a fixed sum of tax; inclusion in each class was determined not by wealth, but by rank, quality and status. The clergy, however, were not classified on an individual basis, since they entered into a contract with the King promising to pay a lump sum of 4 million livres per year (later raised to 10 million for 1695 and 1696) instead of being subject to the poll tax. Taxpayers of the first class were to pay 2,000 livres per year, those of the second class 1,500, those of the third 1,000 and so on down to the last class whose members were assessed for one livre. No one had to pay double poll tax; persons holding several titles or offices only contribute in correspondence with the highest class he belonged to. Married sons or sons with dependents were obliged to pay the poll tax even if they lived with their parents. The tax of widows was reduced by half, and that of minors with three quarters.

The poll tax rolls were drawn up by the intendants of provinces with the aid of deputies or trustees in the countries of estates and by a certain number of gentlemen appointed by the king in the countries of elections. The intendants of provinces also handled the poll tax rolls of members of the army; the intendants of the navy and the galley corps those of these fleets. The provost of merchants and the aldermen were responsible for the rolls of the city of Paris. Nobles were, however, taxed on a separate roll. The poll tax was payable in two fixed terms, one in March, and the other in June. Collection of the poll tax was entrusted to the receivers of the Taille in the rural parishes, to the receivers of common funds in cities in the countries of elections and to the provincial treasurers in the countries of estastes. In the military it was the responsibility of the paymasters. The guardians of the treasury collected the poll tax from bankers and stockbrokers.

The gross revenue for the poll tax was 21 million livres in 1695, which after deductions for miscellaneous expenses and moderations granted to provinces, cities and individuals amounted to a net income of 19 million livres. In 1696 the gross income amounted to 23 million livres, the contribution from the clergy not included. In 1697 the gross income was 24 million with the contribution of the clergy included. The total contributions for the three years may be estimated to 67 million livres.

After the Peace of Ryswick 20 September 1697 the poll tax was abolished, as of 1 April 1698.

== Social implications ==
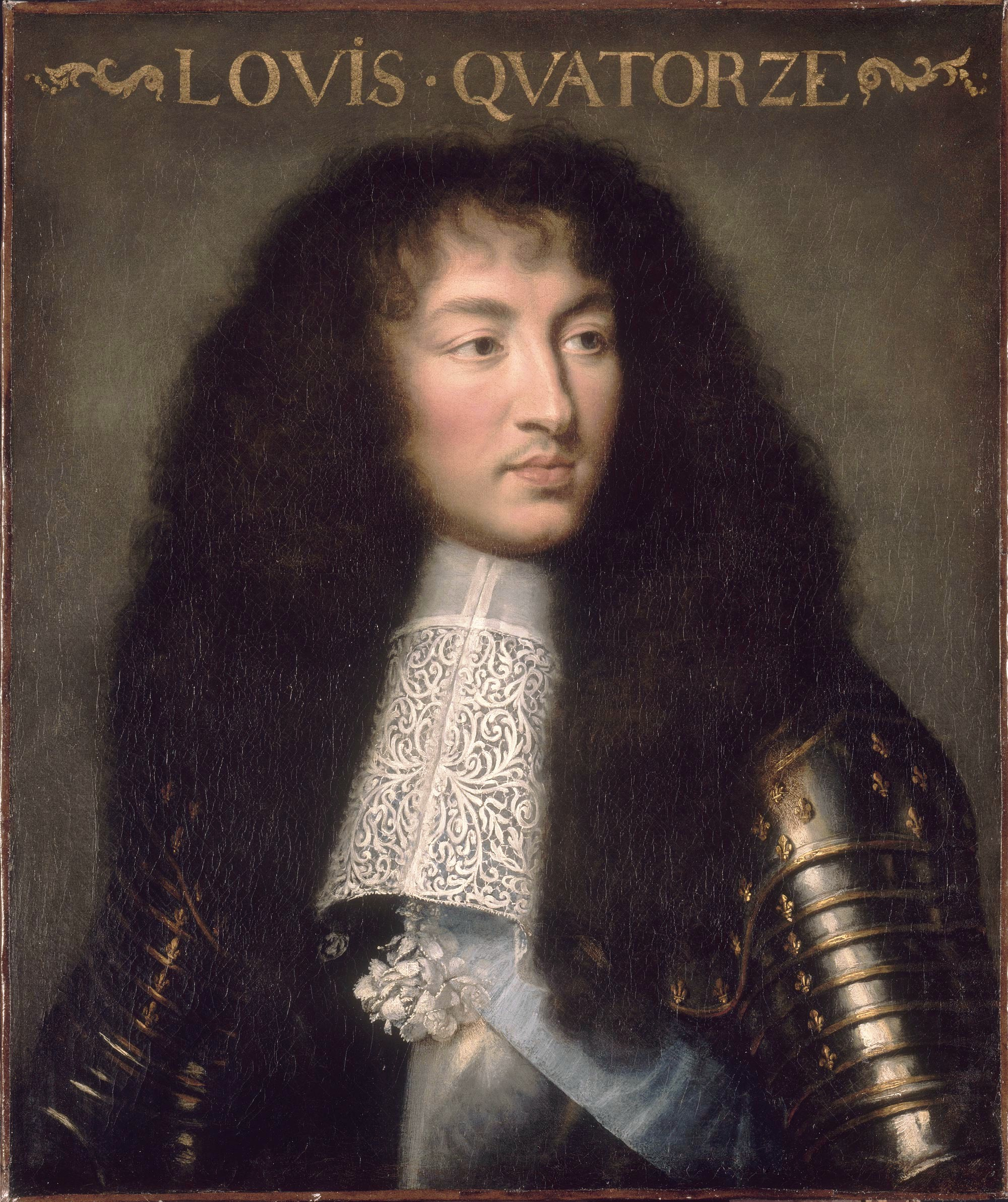
Louis XIV in 1661.

French historians have studied the social implications of the classifications in the schedule to the poll tax decree.

François Bluche and Jean-François Solnon maintain that the poll tax schedule constitutes a veritable social hierarchy in France. It is a deliberate expression of the King's efforts to reorganize the social order on service to the State; a project that began at the death of Cardinal Mazarin in 1661, when Louis XIV personal reign began. The new social hierarchy was to be founded on social class and not on the estates. In the schedule, the nobility is identified in the first three classes, but then reappears only at the head of class seven with marquises, counts, viscounts and barons. These were holders of fiefdoms of dignity, although in practice the innumerable beneficiaries of courtesy titles also were taxed. While jurists persisted in using anachronistic definitions of nobility in the spirit of Charles Loyseau, the schedule recognises that all gentlement of France, once the dukes and knights of the Order of the Holy Spirit are set aside, are equals. In this seventh class, the marquises and viscounts rub shoulders with tax collectors, paymasters, subcontractors and principal writers. Bluche & Solon deduce that a change of status is detectable not only between the end of class six and the beginning of class seven, but also between the end of class 13 and the beginning of class 14.

Alain Guery rejects that the schedule to the poll tax forms a social hierarchy. He contends that the purpose of the schedule to the poll tax is not sociological; it doesn't give us a straight representation of the true social hierarchy of France at this time. On the contrary, it is a picture of how the government wants to perceive and organize society. The implemented criterion of classification is proximity to the State, and to the State at war. It's not essential that the clergy and others who cannot maintain the government in war are missing from its pages. The French are classified in relation to the State such as it is, but also as the government wants it to be. The functional tripartition of the Middle Ages is substituted by a new social order that does not completely deny the preceding world but modifies it. The schedule's double hierarchies of classes and estates are a compromise between State and society. Those whose importance the State recognizes in society as it wishes are identified with precision, the other are regrouped in categories much blurrier and vague.

== Schedule ==
The schedule was originally issued on 18 January 1695 as part of the King's declaration. The Royal Council of Finances amended it through three addendums: 12 February 1695, 26 February 1695 and 31 January 1696.

Class	Tax Livre tournois	Members of the class
1	2,000	The Dauphin of France, the Duke of Orléans, the Duke of Chartres, the Duchess of Guise, the Prince of Condé, the Duke of Bourbon, the Dowager Princess of Conti, the Prince of Conti, the Duke of Maine, the Count of Toulouse, the Duchess of Verneuil, the Chancellor of France, the Chief of the Council of Finances, ministers of state, secretaries of State, the Controller-General of Finances, guardians of the Royal Treasury, treasurers of the Extraordinary of War, treasurers of the Navy, and farmers-generals.
2	1,500	Princes and dukes, marshals of France, crown officers, the Premier President of the Parlement of Paris, governors of provinces, councillors of the Council of Finances, intendants des finances, and treasurers of casual revenues.
3	1,000	Knights and great officers of the Order of the Holy Spirit, lieutenant-generals of provinces, vice admirals, présidens à mortier of Paris, premier presidents of the Parliaments of the Provinces, secretaries of the Royal Council, receiver-generals of finances, treasurers of the Provincial estates, treasurers of the Galley Fleet, and receivers of judicial deposits of Paris. Addendum: The treasurer-generals of the Ordinary of War.
4	500	Councillors of state, procurator- and advocate-generals of the Parlement of Paris, the Chief Clerk of the Parlement of Paris, the Presidents of the Court of Auditors of Paris, of the Court of Aids, of the Great Council, and the Provost of Paris, the Civil Lieutenant, the Lieutenant of Police, the Provost of Merchants of Paris, captain-lieutenants of the Corps of Gendarmes and Light Cavalry of the Maison Militaire, the Receiver General of the Clergy, great petitioners, keepers of the rolls, controller-generals of the Great Chancery, treasurers of the Seal, treasurers of the Artillery, and commissioners of real property seizures of Paris.
5	400	Masters of requests (holders and former holders) and honorary councillors of the Parlement of Paris, the Procurator-General of the Court of Auditors of Paris, procurator- and advocate-generals and chief clerks of the courts of aids and of the Great Council, the prermier presidents of the courts of auditors and courts of aids of the provinces, intendants of the Navy and provinces (who are not former masters of requests), governors of border fortresseses, clerks and the keeper of the minutes of the Great Council, the Chief Clerk of the Court of Auditors of Paris, fortification treasurers, treasurers of building, treasurers of the Swiss League, and guarantors of bail at the Great Council. Third addendum: The Intendant of the Navy having the general inspection of the register of sailors, and the Intendant of the Naval Forces.
6	300	Lieutenant-generals of the King's Armies, Lieutenant-generals of the Navy and of the Galley Fleet, the Lieutenant-Generals of the Artillery, the King's lieutenants of the provinces (created ex officio), sub-lieutenants of the Corps of Gendarmes and Light Cavalry of the Maison Militaire, premier presidents of the superior councils of provinces, présidens à mortier of the provincial Parliaments, presidents of investigations and requests of the Parlement of Paris, the private and criminal lieutenants and the King's Procurator of the Châtelet of Paris, civil and criminal chief clerks of the Châtelet of Paris, treasurers of the Marc d'Or fees, and farmer-generals of the Mail. Addendum: The Chief Criminal Clerk of the Parlement of Paris, and the Chief Clerk of Requests of the Hôtel de Ville of Paris.
7	250	Marquises, counts, viscounts and barons, the Provost of Île de la Cité, the Criminal Lieutenant of the Robe Courte and the Knight of the Royal Watch, the King's Procurator, the Clerk and the Receiver of the Hôtel de Ville of Paris, court clerks of the Great Chamber of the Parlement of Paris, paymasters of annuities, receivers of the Taille and the receivers of the Royal Demesne, receivers of fines, receivers of court fees, receivers of deposited moneys and commissioners of real property seizures of cities or parliaments, of the court of auditors and of the court of aids, treasurers of bridges and roads, receivers of the Admiralty, controllers of the Mail, controllers of the Swiss League, paymasters of salaries of the high courts, directors of the Ferme, cashiers of indirect taxes and of the Gabelle, and sub-contractors and sub-farmers of the Ferme. Addendum: Presidents of the courts of auditors, of the courts of aids, and of the courts of requests of the palace in the provinces, presidents of the Court of the Mint, procurators of the Court of the Mint, chief clerk of the Court of the Mint, the Chief Clerk of the Court of Requests of the Palace in Paris, director-generals of provisions and magazines, principal writers to the Extraordinary of War.
8	200	Marshals of the King's camps and armies, the chefs d'escadre of the ships and galleys, quartermaster-generals of the King's camps and armies, ensigns, cornets and guidons of the Corps of Gendarmes and Light Cavalry of the Maison Militaire, councillors of the superior courts of Paris, great bailiffs of the sword, masters of the Court of Auditors of Paris, the advocate-general of the Court of Auditors of Paris, the Procurator-General of Requests of the Hôtel de Ville of Paris, the Lieutenant-General of the Court of the Marble Table, great masters of water and forests, King's secretaries in the Great Chancery, presidents and treasurers of France in Paris, clerks of presentation and affirmation in the Parlement of Paris, and first writers of the Secretaries of State, of the Controller-General of Finances, of the Royal Treasurer and of the Treasurers of Casual Revenues. Addendum: Advocates and King's procurators of the Treasury of France in Paris. Second addendum: The Chief Clerk of the Bureau of Finances in Paris. Third addendum: Commissary-generals of the Navy and of the Galley Fleet, and the Inspector-General of the Navy in Bretagne.
9	150	Brigadiers of the King's armies, marshal-generals of Cavalry, major-generals of infantry and cavalry of the King's armies, and captains of the King's ships and galleys, masters of the courts of auditors of the provinces, correctors and auditors of the Court of Auditors of Paris, councillors knights of honour, procurator- and advocate-generals of the superior courts of the provinces, clerks of the extraordinary commissions, writers to the Controller-General of Finances, controller-generals of the Navy and the Galley Fleet, controllers-general of the Gabelle, and the writers to the secretaries and clerks of the Great Council. Addendum: Advocate-generals of the Court of the Mint, presidents of the election of Paris, presidents of salt magazine in Paris, chief clerks of the superior courts in the provinces, provincial receivers of the tax on clergy, paymaster of the salaries of the Secretaries of State.
10	120	Colonels, camp masters of infantry, cavalry and dragoons of the King's armies and other officers with colonel's rank, King's lieutenants at the frontiers, colonels of Archers of the City of Paris, gentlemen lords of the manors of the parishes, the Advocate-General of Requests of the Hôtel de Ville of Paris, aldermen and councillors of the City of Paris, notaries and secretaries of the superior courts of Paris, bailiffs of the Great Council and of the Great Chancery, presidents, treasurers of France, advocates, King's procurators and clerks of the bureaus of the provinces, King's advocates of the Châtelet of Paris, controllers of the Marc d'Or fees, the Director General of the Mint, notaries of the Châtelet of Paris, expeditionary bankers to the Court of Rome and bankers and stockbrokers, keepers of the books and the Controller-General of Residuals of the Court of Auditors of Paris. Addendum: clerk-bag keepers of the Great Chamber and of the Chamber of Investigations of the Parlement of Paris, and clerks of the Chamber of Investigations of the Parlement of Paris. Third addendum: Captain-lieutenants on the flag galleys.
11	100	Commissaries of war, commissaries of the Navy and controller-generals of the Ordinary and Extraordinary of War, correctors and auditors of the courts of auditors of provinces, lieutenant-generals particular and criminal, King's procurators and chief clerks of bailiwicks and sénéchaussées under jurisdiction of parliaments, knights of honor and councillors of the Châtelet of Paris, mayors of cities where there is a parliament or high court, King's secretaries at petty chanceries, receivers of fines and court fees, receivers of deposited moneys and commissioners of real property seizures in cities where there is a bureau of finance or a Presidial court, writers to the Secretaries of State and to the Controller-General of Finances, controllers to paymasters of salaries of the high courts, wholesale merchants, and first bailiffs of parliaments and to the superior courts in Paris. Addendum: The Provost-General of the Constabulary, the Provost-General of the Mint, provost-generals of the Maréchaussée, presidents of Presidial courts in the provinces, the Bailiff of the Royal Palace of Paris, the Criminal lieutenant of the election of Paris, stewards of pavements and dykes, clerk-bag keepers of the Great Council, clerks of the courts of aids and of the courts of requests of the palace, paymasters of the salaries of the treasurers of France, receivers of the tax on clergy in each diocese, provincial generals of the Mint, cashiers of the contractors, foreign exchange brokers, tidal vendors, controller-generals of provisions and magazines, writers of the contribution revenue. Second addendum: Particular masters of water and forests in Paris. Third addendum: Ordinary commissaries of the Galley Fleet following the chains of the condemned, captains of galiots and of naval artillery, the Secretary-General of the Navy, and the Secretary-general of the Galley Fleet.
12	80	Knights of honour, advocates, King's procurators and chief clerks of the Presidial courts of the provinces, porters and other petty officers of the Great Chancery. Addendum: Assessors and councillors of the Presidial courts of the provinces, elected and clerks of the election of Paris, controllers and clerks of the salt magazine in Paris, secretaries to the superior courts in the provinces, chief clerks of requests of the parliaments in the provinces.
13	60	King's lieutenants and majors of fortresses and engineer-directors of fortifications, presidents and criminal lieutenants of elections and salt magazines, lieutenant-generals of the Constabulary and of the Admiralty, aldermen, King's procurators, clerks and receivers of the common funds of city corporations in cities where there is a parliament or other high court, mayors of cities of the second order, judge-keepers of the Mint of Paris, substitutes of the King's men in the superior courts of Paris, controllers to the paymasters of salaries of the superior courts, writers to the Intendants des finances, to the Royal Treasurer and to the Treasurer of Casual Revenue, receiver-generals of the Gabelle, and citizens of large cities living off their rents. Addendum: Lieutenant-generals of the marble tables of the provinces, judge-auditors of the Châtelet of Paris, clerks of the parc civil of the Châtelet of Paris, clerks of the jurisdiction of the auditors of the Châtelet of Paris, and clerks of the consular jurisdictions. Second addendum: Commandants of forts and castles. Third addendum: Storekeepers of ports and arsenals of the Navy and of the Galley Fleet, and the Secretary to the General of the Galleys.
14	50	Lieutenants of artillery, controllers of the Ordinary and Extraordinary of War, substitutes of the King's men in the superior courts of the provinces, commissaries of the Châtelet of Paris, and sub-farmers of the Mail. Addendum: Captains of the Hunt, King's procurators and clerks of the Constabulary, lieutenants of the Marshals of France, assessors of the city halls in cities where there is a parliament or other high court, controllers of the Royal Demesne, clerk-writers of the superior courts in the provinces, keepers of the books of the courts of auditors of the provinces, controllers of residuals of the courts of auditors of the provinces, privileged wine merchants, principal writers of the Mail in the cities of the first order, particular writers to the Extraordinary of War, some of the writers of provisions and magazines, and commissary-generals of the streets of Paris. Third addendum: Commissary-generals of the Navy and the Galley Fleet in office, reformed captains of ships and galleys, captains of light frigates, and cashiers to the treasurer-generals of the Navy and of the Galley Fleet.
15	40	The Provost of the Maréchaussée, gentlemen having fiefs and manors, quartermasters of the Corps of Gendarmes and Light Cavalry of the Maison Militaire, the Lieutenant of the Archers of Paris, substitutes of the King's procurators of the Châtelet of Paris, controllers of the annuity of the Hôtel de Ville of Paris, clerks of the Presidial courts and other royal courts, wardmasters of the City of Paris, writers to the receivers of the Ferme, citizens of cities of the second order living off their rents, stewards of private businesses and houses, farmers of land and property whose leases are above 3,000 livres, and millers whose leases are above 2,000 livres. Addendum: Lieutenant-generals of Bailiwicks which are not under the jurisdiction of parliaments, chiefs of provostships, castellanies and other royal justices which are not under the jurisdiction of parliament, provincial controllers of the tax on clergy, conrollers of the Receiver Generals of Finances, parchment clerks of the Parlement of Paris, the first bailiffs of requests of the Hôtel de Ville and of the Royal Palace of Paris, and first bailiffs of the Châtelet of Paris. Second addendum: Particular masters of water and forest, first bailiff to the bureau of finances in Paris, and some of the writers of the Ferme. Third addendum: Provosts of the Navy and of the Galley Fleet.
16	30	Professors of Law, high masters, rectors and principals of Latin Schools, officers of the royal bailiwicks of elections, salt magazines, water and forests, of the Constabulary and of the Admiralty and of the Judges of the Customs, lieutenant-generals of procurators fiscal and clerks of the duchy-peerages, aldermen, King's procurators, clerks, and receivers of the common funds of city corporations in cities of the second order, substitutes for the King's procurators in cities where there is a parliament or other high court, mayors of small cities, paymasters and controllers of salaries of the Presidial courts, advocates of the Great Council, officers of the petty chanceries, first bailiffs of high courts in the provinces, court bailiffs of the Châtelet of Paris, large merchants holding shops, wheat, wine and wood merchants, secretaries to councillors of state, to masters of requests, to intendants, to governors of provinces, to marshals of France, to generals of the armies, to lieutenant-generals of land and sea, to lieutenants civil, of police, criminal, to the King's procurators of the Châtelet of Paris, to the Provost of Merchants and to the procurator- and advocate-generals of the superior courts, traiteurs, messengers of cities where there is a parliament or other superior court, and some of the farmers and yeomen. Addendum: Officers of the Marble Table, assessors of cities of the second order, parchment clerks of requests of the Royal Palace of Paris, court clerks of requests of the parliaments in the provinces, lieutenants of the Provost-General of the Constabulary, first bailiffs of the election and other jurisdictions in Paris, controllers of the tax on clergy in the dioceses, controllers of pavements and dykes, and some of the writers of provisions and magazines. Second addendum: First bailiffs to the bureaus of finances in the provinces, cashiers to bankers, and some of the writers of the Ferme. Third addendum: Secretary-interpreters in service of the Navy, lieutenants and ensigns of ports and arsenals of the Navy and of the Galley Fleet, lieutenants and ensigns of the gardes de l'Étendard réal of the Galley Fleet, captains of fire-ships, and physicians in service of the ports.
17	20	Lieutenants and ensigns of the King's ships and galleys, colonels and majors of urban militias, commissaries of artillery, exempts of the Archers of Paris, professors of the Collège Royal of Paris and others who receive salaries and pensions from the King, the physicians, surgeons and apothecaries in Paris, notaries in cities where there is a parliament or other superior court, judge-keepers of provincial mints, advocates of superior courts, procurators of parliaments, superior courts and the Court of Requests of the Palace, the third party referendaries of the superior courts, the bailiffs of superior courts and of the Court of Requests of the Palace, the private directors of the Mint, town criers of Paris, some of the innkeepers of Paris, some of the farmers and yeomen. Addendum: Lieutenant-colonels of infantry and cavalry, assessors of the city hall of small cities, King's procurators of the Mint, lieutenants of the Hunt, King's procurators in the jurisdiction of the Hunt, clerks in the jurisdiction of the Hunt, captains of the Archers of the Gabelle, first writers of the Mail in cities of the second and third order, inspector-visitors of the Mail, parchment clerks of the Châtelet of Paris, of the election and of other jurisdictions in Paris, parchment clerks of the superior courts in the provinces, diocesan economists, first writers to the consular jurisdictions, directors of the hospital for the King's troops, writers of receiving and distributing fodder for the King's troops in the fortresses, writers delivering the King's passports, some of the writers of provisions and magazines, wardens of the courts of auditors in the provinces, itinerant clerks. Second addendum: King's procurators and clerks of the foreign trade jurisdiction, bailiffs of the Bureau of Finance in Paris, and some of the writers of the Ferme. Third addendum: Reformed captains of light frigates, aid-majors of the Navy and of the Galley Fleet, lieutenants of galiots and of naval artillery, sub-lieutenants of naval artillery, sub-lieutenants of galleys, lieutenants of light frigates, captains of fluyts, ordinary engineers in service of the Navy, premier master shipbuilders, the Captain for custody of the condemned for the galleys at the Château de la Tournelle, surgeon-majors in service of the ports, lieutenants, King's procurators and clerks of the Naval Provostship, captains of merchant ships and of privateers with twenty or more guns.
18	10	Captains and lieutenants of urban militias, commissaries of muster, captains and majors of cavalry and dragoons, fortress engineers, aide-majors and captains of ports, rectors, chancellors, procurators of student nations, and subjects of the universities, substitutes of the King's procurators at the Presidial courts, physicians, surgeons and apothecaries of cities of the first and second order, advocates and procurators of the Châtelet of Paris, controllers of expense fees of the Great Council, of the parliaments and of other superior courts, controllers of court summons of cities where there is a parliament or other superior court, notaries of cities of the second order, controllers of patrimonial funds and grants of cities of the first order, bailiffs of verge, of horse, and by the dozen of the Châtelet of Paris, ten-men of the City of Paris, experts and clerks of the writing desk of Paris, sworn architects, measurers of wood, of coal, brokers and gagers and other officers of police and of the ports, barbers and wig-makers in cities of the first and second order, artisans of big cities holding shops and employing apprentices, some of the innkeepers of Paris, some of the farmers and yeomen, and some of the wine growers. Addendum: Lieutenants of the Archers of the Gabelle, lieutenants of the Provost-General of the Mint, commissaries and controllers of the watch of the Maréchaussé, exempts of the Provost-General of the Constabulary, officers of the royal provostships and castellanies other than the chiefs, clerks of the Mint, assessors, King's procurators and clerks of the Maréchaussé, first bailiffs of the Presidial courts in the provinces, bailiffs of the petty chanceries, bailiffs of the financial bureaus in the provinces, subcontractors of provisions, store-keeper of provisions, mail writers sorting letters, writers to the principal writers of the Extraordinary of War and of provisions and magazines, prison wardens, married esquires, married stewards, and parish beadles in Paris. Second addendum: Scriveners in cities where there is a parliament, some of the writers of the Ferme, master scribes of the notaries in Paris, apprentices to merchants with stores in Paris, non-married esquires and non-married stewards. Third addendum: Reformed lieutenants and ensigns of the Navy and the Galley Fleet, masters of hydrography, master shipbuilders of the Navy and the Galley Fleet, captains of merchant ships and privateers with ten to twenty guns, chaplains in service of ports and arsenals of the Navy and the Galley Fleet, and writers to the cashiers and principal writers of the treasurer-generals of the Navy and the Galley Fleet.
19	6	Captains and majors of infantry, gentlemen without fiefs or manors, teachers, bedells and messengers of the universities, aldermen, King's procurators, clerks and receivers of the common funds of small cities, mayors of walled towns, receivers of deposited moneys and fines, and commissioners of real property seizures, of royal courts, notaries of small cities, controllers of patrimonial funds and grants in cities of the second order, court bailiffs of the Presidial courts, citizens of small cities living off their rents, some of the innkeepers of Paris and closed cities, tavernkeepers, artisans of cities of the second order holding shops and employing apprentices, messengers of small cities and closed towns, and postmasters. Addendum: Lieutenants of cavalry and dragoons, aide-majors of infantry, cavalry and dragoons, brigadiers of the Ferme, game keepers, bailiffs of the consular jurisdictions, controllers of the troop hospitals, writers in charge of provisions for the frontier fortresses, writers distributing letters at the Mail, parish beadles in the provinces, parish vergers, and married cooks and sommeliers. Second addendum: Scriveners in the cities of the second order, bailiffs of the Presidial courts, apprentices to great merchants with stores in cities of the first order, master scribes of the advocates and notaries in Paris, master ccribes of notaries in cities of the first order, apprentices to great merchants with shops, widowed damsels, unmarried cooks and sommeliers. Third addendum: Quartermasters of the gardes de l'Étendard réal of the Galley Fleet, aids of the naval artillery, engineer aids and draughtsmen of the Navy and the Galley Fleet, chief of brigades of the gardes-marine, captains of merchant ships and of privateers with less than ten guns, lieutenants and ensigns of merchant ships and of privateers with less than ten guns, and extraordinary surgeons serving in the ports and arsenals of the Navy and the Galley Fleet.
20	3	Lieutenants, sub-lieutenants and ensigns of infantry, cornets of cavalry and dragoons, principal clerks of ships and galleys, quartermasters of cavalry and dragoons, lieutenants and exempts of the Maréchaussée, storekeepers of artillery, gardes-marine, archers of the Hôtel de Ville of Paris, of the Provost of Île de la Cité and of the Lieutenant of Public Order of Paris, judges of the seigneurial courts, advocates and procurators of the Presidial courts and other royal courts, third party referendaries of Presidial and other royal courts, controllers of expense fees of the Presidial courts, bailiwick courts and other royal courts, aldermen, royal procurators, clerks and receivers of common funds of small cities and towns, physicians, surgeons and apothecaries of small cities and walled towns, clerk-collectors of Languedoc, clerks of the rolls of the Taille and of other taxes, procurators fiscal and clerks of the seigneurial courts, bailiffs, procurators and clerks of the royal courts, town criers in the provinces, jurors and trustees of city guilds and the caretaker of the market hall in Paris, controllers of the Ferme, experts and clerks of the provincial writing desks, surveyors of water and forests, notaries and practitioners of towns and villages, controllers of patrimonial funds and grants in small cities and walled towns, substitute royal procurators of small cities and communities, sergeants of the water and forest guard, assayers and engraves of the Mint, writers of the Mint, money changers, housekeeping artisans of small cities and walled towns, hoteliers and innkeepers in walled towns, millers whose leases are below 2,000 livres, some of the yeomen and farmers, and some of the wine-growers. Addendum: Exempts of the Provost-General of the Mint, exempts or brigadiers of the watch, guards of the Ferme, archers of the Gabelle, archers of the Provost-General of the Constabulary, assessors of town halls in walled towns, surgeon-majors of regiments, couriers, married Valets de chambre. Second addendum: Scribes to notaries and procurators in Paris and the provinces, merchant's apprentices, unmarried Valets de chambre, chambermaids, and some of the servants in Paris. Third addendum: Ordinary writers in the service of the Navy and the Galley Fleet, registry clerks serving in the conscription of seamen, extraordinary writers in the ports and arsenals of Navy and the Galley Fleet and in the registry bureaus, boatswains serving in the ports and arsenals of Navy and the Galley Fleet, master workers serving in the ports and arsenals of the Navy and the Galley Fleet with a pay of 30 livres a month and above, teaching masters of the gardes-marin, brigadiers and sub-brigadiers of the gardes-marin, officers and servants in service of hospitals for the sick with a pay of 30 livres a month and above, petty officers with a pay of 30 livres a month and above, bombardiers with a pay of 30 livres a month and above, non-commissioned officers of the Galley Fleet with a pay of 30 livres a month and above, captains of merchant ships with no guns, and surgeons, writers and chaplains of merchant ships and privateers.
21	2	The gendarmes and light cavalrymen of the Maison Militaire and kettle-drummers and trumpeters of these corps, sergeants of infantry, archers of the Maréchaussée, sergeants of the seigneurial courts, craftsmen of towns and villages, and some of the wine-growers. Addendum: Archers of the Provost-General of the Mint, archers of the watch, factors, married gardeners, married coachmen and porters. Second addendum: Unmarried gardeners, unmarried coachmen and porters, and some of the servants in Paris and servants in the cities of first and second order. Third addendum: Foreign petty officers serving in the Navy and the Galley Fleet and on merchants ships and privateers, archers of the Navy and the Galley Fleet, wardens of port prisons, porters of the arsenals of the Navy and the Galley Fleet, petty officers, bombardiers and non-commissioned officers of the Galley Fleet paid less than 30 livres per month, captains-of-arms and corporals of the Compagnies franches de la marine, officers and servants in service of hospitals for the sick paid less than 30 livres per month, petty officers crippled in the service enjoying a half-pay of 30 livres a month and above, and master workers serving in the ports and arsenals of the Navy and the Galley Fleet paid less than 30 livres per month.
22	1	Soldiers, cavalrymen, dragoons, seamen, trumpeters, kettle-drummers, drummers and fifers, simple workers and day labourers. In general, all the inhabitants of towns and villages who contribute to the Taille. Addendum: Married postilions, grooms and lackeys, married shepherds, carters and other servants of yeomen, farmers and other country dwellers. Second addendum: Apprentices to surgeons and apothecaries, apprentices to barbers and wig-makers, apprentices to tavernkeepers, apprentices to artisans, unmarried postilions, grooms and lackeys and other servants not included in the schedule or its addendums, shepherds, carters and other servants of yeomen, farmers and other country dwellers who are not married, and servants in small cities, towns and villages. Third addendum: Oar and bow mariners serving on the galleys, galley partisaniers, prayers of the galleys, apprentice gunners of the ships and galleys, keepers of ships and arsenals of the Navy and the Galley Fleet, petty officers crippled in the service enjoying a half-pay of less than 30 livres a month, and foreign seamen serving in the navy and the galleys and on merchants ships and privateers.
In general:		Second addendum: Former and honorary officials will pay the same poll tax as the incumbents.
