= Poll tax =

Fixed tax paid by every liable individual

A poll tax, also known as head tax or capitation, is a tax levied as a fixed sum on every liable individual (typically every adult), without reference to income or resources. Poll is an archaic term for "head" or "top of the head". The sense of "counting heads" is found in phrases like polling place and opinion poll.

Poll taxes were important sources of revenue for many governments from ancient times until the 19th century. In England, poll taxes were levied by the government of John of Gaunt in the 14th century and Charles II in the 17th century. In the United Kingdom a poll tax was levied by the government of Margaret Thatcher in the 20th century. In the United States, voting poll taxes (whose payment was a precondition to voting in an election) have been used to disfranchise impoverished and minority voters (especially after Reconstruction).

Poll taxes are regressive with respect to income, meaning the higher someone's income is, the lower the tax is as a proportion of income: for example, a $500 tax on an income of $10,000 is a 5% tax rate, while $500 tax on a $1,000,000 income is 0.05%. Its acceptance or "neutrality" depends on the balance between the tax demanded and the resources of the population. Low amounts generally go unnoticed, while high amounts may generate tax revolts such as the 1381 Peasants' Revolt in England and the 1906 Bambatha Rebellion against colonial rule in South Africa. However, both of those cases were additional taxation, and not a substitute for other taxes being lowered.

== Religious law ==
=== Mosaic law ===
As prescribed in Exodus, Jewish law imposed a poll tax of a half-shekel, payable by every man above the age of twenty.

^{11}And the LORD spake unto Moses, saying,

^{12}When thou takest the sum of the children of Israel after their number, then shall they give every man a ransom for his soul unto the LORD, when thou numberest them; that there be no plague among them, when thou numberest them.

^{13}This they shall give, every one that passeth among them that are numbered, half a shekel after the shekel of the sanctuary: (a shekel is twenty gerahs:) an half shekel shall be the offering of the LORD.

^{14}Every one that passeth among them that are numbered, from twenty years old and above, shall give an offering unto the LORD.

^{15}The rich shall not give more, and the poor shall not give less than half a shekel, when they give an offering unto the LORD, to make an atonement for your souls.

^{16}And thou shalt take the atonement money of the children of Israel, and shalt appoint it for the service of the tabernacle of the congregation; that it may be a memorial unto the children of Israel before the LORD, to make an atonement for your souls.

— Exodus 30:11–16

The money was designated for the Tabernacle in the Exodus narrative and later for the upkeep of the Temple of Jerusalem. Priests, women, slaves and minors were exempted, but could offer it voluntarily. Payment by Samaritans or Gentiles was rejected. It was collected yearly in the month of Adar at the Temple or provincial collection offices.

=== Islamic law ===
Zakat al-Fitr is an obligatory charity that must be given by every Muslim (or their guardian) near the end of every Ramadan, except for those in dire poverty. The amount is 2 kg (4.4 lb) of wheat or barley, or its cash equivalent, to be given to the poor.

Jizya is a land or poll tax decreed by the Quran, paid annually by non-believers in Islam living under Islamic law (residents with dhimmi status). Jizya began during the reign of Muhammad (from 9 A.H.) in places like Yemen, Bahrain, and Jerash. As a poll tax, the tax usually only applied to free, able-bodied adult men. The jizya amount could also vary with the income of the individual. However, according to Shibli Nomani, the word jizya is an Arabicised version of the Persian kizyat, the war tax levied by the Persian empire, which served as a model for the conquering Arabs. The Sasanian Persian emperor Nawsherwan imposed a poll tax, termed jizya by Arab historians, varying between 12 and 2 dirhams, exempting officials, soldiers, and nobles. During the Islamic rule of Muhammad, the magi of Iran and landowners of Bahrain paid jizya of 1 dinar or its equivalent in clothing, while the landless paid 4 dirham and a striped woolen cloak. Elsewhere, the jizya was graded according to three classes, e.g. 48 dirhams for the rich, 24 for the middle class, and 12 for the poor.

Although the jizya tax is interpreted by many as a financial humiliation on non-Muslims, others consider it a sign of due allegiance to the political authority of Islam: part of a social contract by which non-Muslims, especially the Jews of Medina, were granted equal social and political rights, and protection of their life, property, and religion. According to some scholars, the jizya paid by non-Muslims is parallel to the zakat charity obligation on Muslims. However, Umar, the second Caliph, ordered a brand on the shoulder of jizya payers, as well as requiring a tonsure and sumptuary laws to distinguish them from Muslims. Uman distinguished between jizya and kharaj, where the former means the poll tax on non-Muslim individuals, and the latter means the land tax and sometimes the total sum of taxes paid by leaders of the non-Muslim community. Umar stressed that conversion to Islam provided exemption from jizya, though not from kharaj.

Amr ibn al-As, after conquering Egypt, made a census for the jizya according to wealth classes, so that the rich paid more. Abd al-Malik ibn Marwan reformed taxes in Mesopotamia based on a calculation of the income and expenses of a typical man, determining that each adult could pay jizya of 4 dinars, a 400% increase over the previous tax; however, this burden seemingly did not increase conversions to Islam.

The Cairo Geniza records demonstrate the poll tax collection becoming very strict and burdensome for the Jewish community in Egypt during the 12th century. Evidence suggests that the guardian of a minor was responsible to pay the full poll tax on his behalf until the age of ten. Even the very sick and poor widows were subject to the tax. Shelomo Dov Goitein concluded that the intolerable burden of the jizya might have caused the mass conversion of Jews in Egypt to Islam, while more prominent Jews embraced Islam for the possibility of government positions.

The treaty of 1535, known as the Franco-Ottoman alliance, revolutionised relations between the Christian and Islamic states, with the poll tax playing a significant role. Previously, a non-Muslim living in Muslim territory for more than a year became liable to the poll tax. Under the treaty, French Christians in the Ottoman Empire were exempted from all jizya. In 1855, the Ottoman Empire abolished the jizya tax as part of reforms to equalize the status of Muslims and non-Muslims. It was replaced by a military-exemption tax on non-Muslims, the bedel-i askeri. It was once believed that the Islamic poll tax derived from a previous Byzantine poll tax, but evidence for this tax has been re-dated to Islamic times.

Jizya reemerged in 2014 after the Islamic State conquered some parts of Iraq and Syria. Its leader Abu Bakr al-Baghdadi declared that Christians would face the choice of conversion, jizya, or death. This ultimatum was read out in mosques. Many Christians fled Mosul, home to the ancient Christian communities of Iraq, leading Louis Raphaël I Sako to say: "For the first time in the history of Iraq, Mosul is now empty of Christians." ISIS issued the same ultimatum in its capital of Raqqa, Syria, demanding 0.5 ounces (14 g) of pure gold from Christians in exchange for their safety.

== Canada ==
The Chinese head tax was a fixed fee charged to each Chinese person entering Canada. The head tax was first levied after the Canadian parliament passed the Chinese Immigration Act of 1885 and was meant to discourage Chinese people from entering Canada after the completion of the Canadian Pacific Railway. The tax was abolished by the Chinese Immigration Act of 1923, which stopped all Chinese immigration except for business people, clergy, educators, students, and other categories. The 1923 act was repealed in 1947.

== Ceylon ==
In Ceylon, a poll tax was levied by the British colonial government of Ceylon in 1920. The tax charged 2 rupees per year per male adult. Those who did not pay had to work on the roads for one day in lieu of the tax. The Young Lanka League protested the tax, led by A. Ekanayake Gunasinha, and it was repealed by the Legislative Council of Ceylon in 1925 following a motion submitted by C. H. Z. Fernando.

== Great Britain ==
The poll tax was essentially a lay subsidy, a tax on the movable property of most of the population, to help fund war. It had first been levied in 1275 and continued under different names until the 17th century. People were taxed a percentage of the assessed value of their movable goods. That percentage varied from year to year and place to place, and which goods could be taxed differed between urban and rural locations. Churchmen were exempt, as were the poor, workers in the Royal Mint, inhabitants of the Cinque Ports, tin workers in Cornwall and Devon, and those who lived in the Palatinate counties of Cheshire and Durham.

=== 14th century ===
In 1376 Britain had been fighting the Hundred Years War against France for about fifty years, and it was increasingly difficult to finance the war. In 1377 the Bad Parliament first levied a poll tax at the request of John of Gaunt the de facto head of government at the time. The tax covered a far greater share of the population than previous taxes. It was levied again in 1379 on a basis graded by social class. Finally in 1381 it was a combination of both flat rate and graduated assessments. The minimum amount payable was set at 4d, however tax collectors had to account for a 12d a head mean assessment. and has been credited as one of the main reasons behind the Peasants' Revolt in that year.

=== 17th century ===
The poll tax was resurrected during the 17th century, usually related to a military emergency. It was imposed by Charles I in 1641 to finance the raising of the army against the Scottish and Irish uprisings. With the Restoration of Charles II in 1660, the Convention Parliament of 1660 instituted a poll tax to finance the disbanding of the New Model Army (pay arrears, etc.) through the Poll Tax Act 1660 (12 Cha. 2. c. 9), as amended by the Poll Tax (Amendment) Act 1660 (12 Cha. 2. c. 10) and the Poll Tax (Amendment No. 2) Act 1660 (12 Cha. 2. c. 28). The poll tax was assessed according to "rank", e.g. dukes paid £100, earls £60, knights £20, esquires £10. Eldest sons paid two-thirds of their father's rank, widows paid a third of their late husband's rank. The members of the livery companies paid according to company's rank (e.g. masters of first-tier guilds like the Mercers paid £10, whereas masters of fifth-tier guilds, like the Clerks, paid 5 shillings). Professionals also paid differing rates, e.g. physicians (£10), judges (£20), advocates (£5), attorneys (£3), and so on. Anyone with property (land, etc.) paid 40 shillings per £100 earned, anyone over the age of 16 and unmarried paid twelvepence and everyone else over 16 paid sixpence.

To finance the Nine Years' War, a poll tax was imposed again by William III and Mary II in 1689 with the Poll Tax Act 1688 (1 Will. & Mar. c. 13) (Note: This is the citation in The Statutes of the Realm.), reassessed in 1690 adjusting rank for fortune with the Poll Tax Act 1689 (2 Will. & Mar. c. 2), and then again in 1691 back to rank irrespective of fortune with the Poll Tax Act 1691 (3 Will. & Mar. c. 6). The poll tax was imposed again in 1692 with the "Poll Tax Act 1694 (5 & 6 Will. & Mar. c. 14), and one final time in 1698 with the Poll Tax Act 1697 (9 Will. 3. c. 38), the last poll tax in England until the 20th century.

A poll tax ("polemoney") was simultaneously imposed in Scotland by the Edinburgh parliament in 1693, again in 1695, and two in 1698.

As the greater weight of the 17th century poll taxes fell primarily upon the wealthy and powerful, it was not too unpopular. There were grumblings within the taxed ranks about lack of differentiation by income within ranks. Ultimately, it was the inefficiency of their collection (what they brought in routinely fell far short of expected revenues) that prompted the government to abandon the poll tax after 1698.

Far more controversial was the hearth tax introduced by the Fire-Hearth and Stoves Taxation Act 1662 (14 Cha. 2. c. 10), which imposed a hefty two shillings on every hearth in a family dwelling, which was easier to count than persons. Heavier, more permanent and more regressive than the poll tax proper, the intrusive entry of tax inspectors into private homes to count hearths was a very sore point, and it was promptly repealed with the Glorious Revolution in 1689. It was replaced with a "window tax" in 1695 since inspectors could count windows from outside homes.

=== 20th century ===
The Community Charge, popularly dubbed the "poll tax", was a tax to fund local government, instituted in 1989 by the government of Margaret Thatcher. It replaced the rates that were based on the notional rental value of a house. The abolition of rates was in the Conservative Party manifesto for the 1979 general election; the replacement was proposed in the Green Paper of 1986, Paying for Local Government based on ideas developed by Dr. Madsen Pirie and Douglas Mason of the Adam Smith Institute. It was a fixed tax per adult resident, but there was a reduction for those with lower household income. Each person was to pay for the services provided in their community. This proposal was contained in the Conservative Party manifesto for the 1987 general election. The new tax replaced the rates in Scotland from the start of the 1988/89 financial year and in England and Wales from the start of the 1990/91 financial year.

The system was very unpopular since many thought it shifted the tax burden from the rich to the poor, as it was based on the number of occupants living in a house, rather than on the estimated market value of the house. Many tax rates set by local councils proved to be much higher than earlier predictions since the councils realized that not they, but the central government would be blamed for the tax, which led to resentment, even among some who had supported the introduction of it. The tax in different boroughs differed because local taxes paid by businesses varied and grants by central government to local authorities sometimes varied capriciously.

Mass protests were called by the All Britain Anti-Poll Tax Federation with which the vast majority of local Anti-Poll Tax Unions (APTUs) were affiliated. In Scotland, the APTUs called for mass nonpayment, which rapidly gathered widespread support and spread as far as England and Wales even though non-payment meant that people could be prosecuted. In some areas, 30% of former ratepayers defaulted. While owner-occupiers were easy to tax, nonpayers who regularly changed accommodation were almost impossible to trace. The cost of collecting the tax rose steeply, and its returns fell. Unrest grew and resulted in a number of poll tax riots. The most serious was in a protest at Trafalgar Square, London, on 31 March 1990, of more than 200,000 protesters. Terry Fields, Labour MP for Liverpool Broadgreen, was jailed for 60 days for his refusal to pay the poll tax.

This unrest was a factor in the fall of Thatcher. Her successor, John Major, replaced the Community Charge with the Council Tax, similar to the rating system that preceded the Community Charge. The main differences were that it was levied on capital value rather than notional rental value of a property, and that it had a 25% discount for single-occupancy dwellings.

In 2015, Lord Waldegrave reflected in his memoirs that the Community Charge was all his own work and that it was a serious mistake. Although he felt the policy looked like it would work, it was implemented differently from his predictions "They went gung-ho and introduced it overnight in one go, which was never my plan and I thought they must know what they were doing – but they didn't."

== France ==
In France, a poll tax, the capitation of 1695, was first imposed by King Louis XIV in 1695 as a temporary measure to finance the War of the League of Augsburg, and thus repealed in 1699. It was resumed during the War of Spanish Succession and in 1704 set on a permanent basis, remaining until the end of the Ancien régime.

Like the English poll tax, the French capitation tax was assessed on rank – for taxation persons, French society was divided in twenty-two "classes", with the Dauphin (a class by himself) paying 2,000 livres, princes of the blood paying 1,500 livres, and so on down to the lowest class, composed of day laborers and servants, who paid 1 livre each. The bulk of the common population was covered by four classes, paying 40, 30, 10 and 3 livres respectively. Unlike most other direct French taxes, nobles and clergy were not exempted from capitation taxes. It did, however, exempt the mendicant orders and the poor who contributed less than 40 sous.

The French clergy managed to temporarily escape capitation assessment by promising to pay a total sum of 4 million livres per annum in 1695, and then obtained permanent exemption in 1709 with a lump sum payment of 24 million livres. The Pays d'états (Brittany, Burgundy, etc.) and many towns also escaped assessment by promising annual fixed payments. The nobles did not escape assessment, but they obtained the right to appoint their own capitation tax assessors, which allowed them to escape most of the burden (in one calculation, they escaped 7/8 of it).

Compounding the burden, the assessment on the capitation did not remain stable. The pays de taille personelle (basically, pays d'élection, the bulk of France and Aquitaine) secured the ability to assess the capitation tax proportionally to the taille – which effectively meant adjusting the burden heavily against the lower classes. According to the estimates of Jacques Necker in 1788, the capitation tax was so riddled in practice, that the privileged classes (nobles and clergy and towns) were largely exempt, while the lower classes were heavily crushed: the lowest peasant class, originally assessed to pay 3 livres, were now paying 24, the second lowest, assessed at 10 livres, were now paying 60 and the third-lowest assessed at 30 were paying 180. The total collection from the capitation, according to Necker in 1788, was 41 million livres, well short of the 54 million estimate, and it was projected that the revenues could have doubled if the exemptions were revoked and the original 1695 assessment properly restored.

The old capitation tax was repealed with the French Revolution and replaced, on 13 January 1791, with a new poll tax as part of the contribution personnelle mobilière, which lasted well into the late 19th century. It was fixed for every individual at "three days's labor" (assessed locally, but by statute, no less than 1 franc 50 centimes and no more than 4 francs 50 centimes, depending on the area). A dwelling tax (impôt sur les portes et fenêtres, similar to the English window-tax) was imposed in 1798.

== New Zealand ==
New Zealand imposed a poll tax on Chinese immigrants during the 19th and early 20th centuries as part of their broader efforts to reduce the number of Chinese immigrants. The poll tax was effectively lifted in the 1930s following the invasion of China by Japan, and was finally repealed in 1944. Prime Minister Helen Clark offered New Zealand's Chinese community an official apology for the poll tax on 12 February 2002.

== Poland–Lithuania ==
The Jewish poll tax was a poll tax imposed on the Jews in Polish–Lithuanian Commonwealth. It was later absorbed into the hiberna tax.

== Roman Empire ==
The ancient Romans imposed a tributum capitis (poll tax) as one of the principal direct taxes on the peoples of the Roman provinces (excluding the core city state of Rome) (Digest 50, tit.15). In the Republican period, poll taxes were principally collected by private tax farmers (publicani), but from the time of Emperor Augustus, the collections were gradually transferred to magistrates and the senates of provincial cities. The Roman census was conducted periodically in the provinces to draw up and update the poll tax register.

The Roman poll tax fell principally on Roman subjects in the provinces, but not on Roman citizens. Towns in the provinces who possessed the Jus Italicum (enjoying the "privileges of Italy") were exempted from the poll tax. The 212 edict of Emperor Caracalla (which formally conferred Roman citizenship on all residents of Roman provinces) did not, however, exempt them from the poll tax.

The Roman poll tax was deeply resented—Tertullian bewailed the poll tax as a "badge of slavery"—and it provoked numerous revolts in the provinces. Perhaps most famous is the Zealot revolt in Judaea of 66 AD. After the destruction of the temple in 70 AD, the Emperor Vespasian imposed an extra poll tax on Jews throughout the empire, the fiscus judaicus, of two denarii each.

== Russia ==
The Russian Empire imposed a poll tax in 1718. Nikolay Bunge, Finance Minister from 1881 to 1886 under Emperor Alexander III, abolished it in 1886. Poll taxes in Imperial Russia were determined by revision list enumerations.

== United States ==
=== Poll tax ===
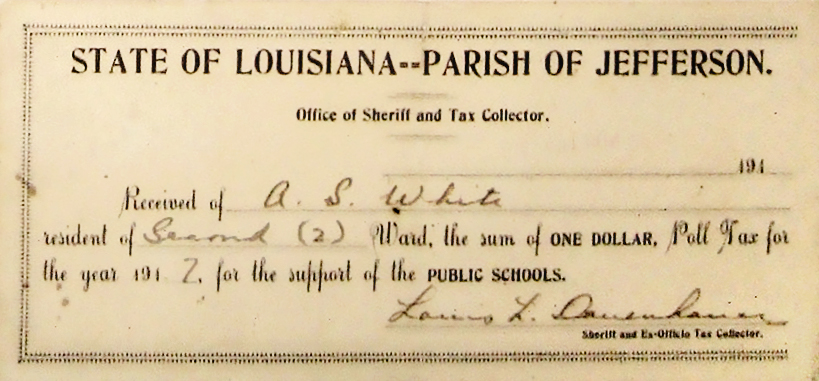
Receipt for payment of poll tax, Jefferson Parish, Louisiana, 1917 (the $1 tax has the purchasing power of $25 today)

Prior to the mid 20th century, a poll tax was implemented in some U.S. state and local jurisdictions and paying it was a requirement before one could exercise one's right to vote. After this right was extended to all races by the Fifteenth Amendment to the Constitution, many Southern states enacted poll taxes as a means of excluding African-American voters, most of whom were poor and unable to pay a tax. So as not to disenfranchise many whites, such laws sometimes included a clause exempting any people who had voted prior to enactment of the laws. The poll tax, along with literacy tests and extra-legal intimidation, such as by the Ku Klux Klan, achieved the desired effect of disenfranchising African Americans.

Memphis was one of the few places in the South where blacks regularly voted. This was because the political machine of E.H. Crump paid their poll tax and thereby encouraged them to vote for his preferred candidates.

Generally, in the United States, the term "poll tax" is used to mean a tax that must be paid in order to vote, rather than a capitation tax simply. For example, a bill that passed the Florida House of Representatives in April 2019 has been compared to a poll tax because it requires former felons to pay all "financial obligations" related to their sentence, including court fines, fees, and judgments, before their voting rights will be restored as required by a referendum that passed with 64% of the vote in 2018.

The Twenty-fourth Amendment, ratified in 1964, prohibits both Congress and the states from conditioning the right to vote in federal elections on payment of a poll tax or any other type of tax. Poll taxes for State and local elections were declared unconstitutional by the Supreme Court in Harper v. Virginia State Board of Elections.

=== Capitation and federal taxation ===
The ninth section of Article One of the Constitution places several limits on Congress' powers. Among them: "No capitation, or other direct, tax shall be laid, unless in proportion to the census or enumeration herein before directed to be taken". Capitation here means a tax of a uniform, fixed amount per taxpayer. Direct tax means a tax levied directly by the United States federal government on taxpayers, as opposed to a tax on events or transactions. The United States government levied direct taxes from time to time during the 18th and early 19th centuries. It levied direct taxes on the owners of houses, land, slaves and estates in the late 1790s but cancelled the taxes in 1802.

An income tax is neither a poll tax nor a capitation, as the amount of tax will vary from person to person, depending on each person's income. Until a United States Supreme Court decision in 1895, all income taxes were deemed to be excises (i.e., indirect taxes). The Revenue Act of 1861 established the first income tax in the United States, to pay for the cost of the American Civil War. This income tax was abolished after the war, in 1872. Another income tax statute in 1894 was overturned in Pollock v. Farmers' Loan & Trust Co. in 1895, where the Supreme Court held that income taxes on income from property, such as rent income, interest income, and dividend income (however excepting income taxes on income from "occupations and labor" if only for the reason of not having been challenged in the case, "We have considered the act only in respect of the tax on income derived from real estate, and from invested personal property") were to be treated as direct taxes. Because the statute in question had not apportioned income taxes on income from property by population, the statute was ruled unconstitutional. Finally, ratification of the Sixteenth Amendment to the United States Constitution in 1913 made possible modern income taxes, by limiting the Sixteenth Amendment income tax to the class of indirect excises (i.e. excises, duties, and imposts) – thus requiring no apportionment, a practice that would remain unchanged into the 21st century.

=== Employment-based head taxes ===
Various cities, including Chicago and Denver, have levied head taxes with a set rate per employee targeted at large employers. After Cupertino postponed head tax proposals to 2020, Mountain View became the only city in Silicon Valley to continue to pursue such type of taxes.

In 2018, the Seattle city council proposed a poll tax, officially the employee hours tax but dubbed the "head tax", of $500 per year per employee, on businesses with annual revenues of over $20 million. The proposed tax was lowered to $275 per year per employee, was passed, and became "the biggest head tax in U.S. history", though it was repealed less than a month later.

== See also ==
- Corvée
- Fixed tax
- Hut tax
- Constrained equal losses – a similar rule in the context of bankruptcy problems.
