= Gérard de Dainville =

Gérard de Dainville (Girardus de Dainvilla; died 18 June 1378) was a prelate of the Holy Roman Empire from an illustrious family of Artois. He was made bishop of Arras in 1361, although he did not take up his see until 1362, was transferred to the diocese of Thérouanne in 1369 and finally transferred to Cambrai in 1371, solemnly entering the city on 8 May 1372. He is known as bishop Gerard III of Cambrai.

Gérard was born at Dainville to a family related to the counts of Flanders. His brothers were Jean, a knight and maître de l'hôtel to the French kings John II and Charles V; Michel, an archdeacon of Ostrevent in the diocese of Arras, who with Gérard co-founded the Collège de Dainville of the University of Paris; and Nicolas, a canon at Paris, Arras and Avranches, and a penitentiary (1362–67). They were uterine brothers of Philippe de Mézières, with whom Gérard maintained a correspondence.

Before he became a bishop, Gérard was a canon at Notre-Dame de Paris, then an archdeacon at Noyon and a canon again at the basilica of Saint-Quentin. He served as a councillor in the Parlement de Paris.

Acting on behalf of the Emperor Charles IV, Gérard invested Duke Albert I of Bavaria-Straubing with the County of Hainaut. Shortly after, some of Gérard's officers got into a dispute with the cathedral chapter, because they had arrested a free man, Robert de Noyers, one of the cathedral servants. On Gérard's orders, the diocesan vicar-general mediated a reconciliation between bishop and chapter in the presence of bishop William VI of Carpentras, the papal nuncio. In 1375, Gérard imposed a new tax (maltôte) without the consent of the chapter, engendering a dispute with the magistrate.

In December 1377, Gérard received the Charles IV in Cambrai, while the emperor was on his way to France. On 23 December the emperor confirmed the privileges, immunities and liberties of the church of Cambrai. Two days later he celebrated Christmas in the cathedral, since Charles V of France did not want him to celebrate Christmas publicly in France.

In 1378, Gérard promised to submit to the Archbishop of Reims, but died on 18 June before he could make good. He was buried in the cathedral of Cambrai under an epitaph that reads, "Hear lies the reverend father of good memory, Gérard de Dainville, one bishop of Arras, then Thérouanne and afterwards Cambrai, who died on 18 June 1378" (Hic jacet Reverendus Pater bonae memoriae G. de Dainvilla, quondam Atrebat., Morin., et postea Camer. ep. qui obiit XVIII die junii an. M CCC LXXVIII).
