= States Provincial =

States Provincial may refer to:

- States Provincial (France), assembly of a province in ancien regime France
- Provincial council (Netherlands), Provinciale Staten in Dutch, the elected assembly of a province of the Netherlands
