= Don gratuit =

The don gratuit or "free gift" in English, was a voluntary contribution to royal finances paid by the First Estate (the clergy) under France's ancien regime. Since they were exempt from taxation such as taille, the First Estate was first requested to pay the don gratuit to fund the fight against the Huguenots under Henry IV and then from 1636 for the defence of the kingdom during the wars against the Protestant states. From Louis XIV's reign, the gift became customary. The don gratuit was decided by the church.

The amount paid was very variable, often the amount would reflect the attitude the clergy had towards the kings rule. The don gratuit was also used as a bribe to the king for the clergy to retain its privileges. Between 1715 and 1788, the clergy would have contributed 288 million livres, or 2.7% of the Royal Treasury's revenue.
