= Jules Louis Bolé, marquis de Chamlay =

French soldier and diplomat

Jules-Louis Bolé de Chamlay (1650–1719) was a French soldier and diplomat.

He was born in a noble family; his father was procureur of the Paris Parlement. Chamlay had a classical education, and the fought in the French army during the Franco-Dutch War (1672–1678). He received the title of maréchal général des logis aux camps et armées du Roi.

He had a meteoric rise, and some years later, he was generally appreciated by the most important generals of his time, like Condé and Turenne. He also became one of the most important aides to Louvois. Very appreciated and listened to by King Louis XIV, he played an important role in determining the "stratégie de cabinet." When Louvois died, the King offered him the Ministry of War, but he had the modesty to refuse and leave the function for Barbezieux, son of Louvois, under whose orders he continued to work.

The King entrusted him with several diplomatic missions. Chamlay also seemed to have played an important role in creating the capitation. La Bruyère and Saint-Simon wrote about him as an expert in military science. He received the Grand Cross of the Order of Saint Louis.
