= Taille =

Former land tax on Ancien Régime French peasants

The taille (French pronunciation: [taj]) was a direct land tax on the French peasantry and non-nobles (Third Estate) in Ancien Régime France. The tax was imposed on each household and was based on how much land it held, and was paid directly to the state.

== History ==
Originally only an "exceptional" tax (i.e. imposed and collected in times of need, as the king was expected to survive on the revenues of the "domaine royal", or lands that belonged to him directly), the taille became permanent in 1439, when the right to collect taxes in support of a standing army was granted to Charles VII of France during the Hundred Years' War. Unlike modern income taxes, the total amount of the taille was first set (after the Estates General was suspended in 1484) by the French king from year to year, and this amount was then apportioned among the various provinces for collection.

Exempted from the tax were clergy and nobles (except for non-noble lands they held in "pays d'état" [see below]), officers of the crown, military personnel, magistrates, university professors and students, and franchises (villes franches) such as Paris.

The provinces were of three sorts, the pays d'élection, the pays d'état and the pays d'imposition. In the pays d'élection (the longest held possessions of the French crown; some of these provinces had had the equivalent autonomy of a pays d'état in an earlier period, but had lost it through the effects of royal reforms) the assessment and collection of taxes were entrusted to elected officials (at least originally; later, these positions were bought), and the tax was generally "personal", meaning it was attached to non-noble individuals. In the pays d'état ("provinces with provincial estates" Brittany, Languedoc, Burgundy, Auvergne, Béarn, Dauphiné, Provence, and such portions of Gascony as Bigorre, Comminges, and the Quatre-Vallées; these recently acquired provinces had been able to maintain a certain local autonomy in terms of taxation), the assessment of the tax was established by local councils and the tax was generally "real", meaning that it was attached to non-noble lands (that is, even nobles possessing such lands were required to pay taxes on them). Finally, pays d'imposition were recently conquered lands which had their own local historical institutions (they were similar to the pays d'état under which they are sometimes grouped), although taxation was overseen by the royal intendant.

In an attempt to reform the fiscal system, new administrative divisions were created in the 16th century. The Recettes générales, commonly known as généralités and overseen in the beginning by receveurs généraux or généraux conseillers (royal tax collectors), were initially only taxation districts. Their role steadily increased and by the mid 17th century, the généralités were under the authority of an intendant, and they became a vehicle for the expansion of royal power in matters of justice, taxation, and policing. By the outbreak of the Revolution, there were 36 généralités; the last two were created as recently as 1784.

Généralités of France in 1789. Areas in red are "pays d'état"; white "pays d'élection"; yellow "pays d'imposition".

Until the late 17th century, tax collectors were called receveurs royaux. In 1680, the system of the Ferme Générale was established, a franchised customs and excise operation in which individuals bought the right to collect the taille on behalf of the king, through six-year adjudications (some taxes, including the aides and the gabelle, had been farmed out in this way as early as 1604). The major tax collectors in that system were known as the fermiers généraux ("farmers-general", in English).

== Collection ==
Efficient tax collection was one of the major causes for French administrative and royal centralization in the Early Modern period. The taille became a major source of royal income (roughly half in the 1570s), the most important direct tax of pre-Revolutionary France, and provided for the growing cost of warfare in the 15th and 16th centuries. Records show the taille increasing from 2.5 million livres in 1515 to six million after 1551; in 1589 the taille reached a record 21 million livres (a period of high inflation), before dropping.

The taille was only one of a number of taxes. There also existed the "taillon" (a tax for military expenditures), a national salt tax (the gabelle), a tax on consumer goods usually used to pay for fortifications (the maltôte), national tariffs (the "aides") on various products (including wine), local tariffs on specialty products (the "douane") or levied on products entering the city (the "octroi") or sold at fairs, and local taxes. Finally, the church benefited from a mandatory tax or tithe called the "dîme".

Louis XIV created several additional tax systems, including the "capitation" (begun in 1695) which touched every person including nobles and the clergy (although exemption could be bought for a large one-time sum) and the "dixième" (1710–1717, restarted in 1733), which was a true tax on income and on property value and was meant to support the military. Every Frenchman, except the Dauphin of France and paupers were subject to the capitation tax. Noble capitation was assessed by the intendant of the generality, and at first it was established that the nobility pay 1/90 of their annual income. This was not always the case, however, as many of the nobility had the means to lobby against the tax, and regularly appeal the assessments. As capitation was paid at the place of residence, rich landlords with many estates, and those who lived in Paris or at the Court of Versailles, could evade it. The duc d'Orleans famously bragged about setting his own rate: "I work things out with the intendants; I pay more or less what I like."

In 1749, under Louis XV, a new tax based on the "dixième", the "vingtième" (or "one-twentieth"), was enacted to reduce the royal deficit, and this tax continued through the ancien régime. This tax was based solely on revenues (5% of net earnings from land, property, commerce, industry and from official offices), and was meant to reach all citizens regardless of status, but the clergy, the regions with "pays d'état" and the parlements protested; the clergy won exemption, the "pays d'état" won reduced rates, and the parlements halted new income statements, effectively making the "vingtième" a far less efficient tax than it was designed to be. The financial needs of the Seven Years' War led to a second (1756–1780), and then a third (1760–1763) "vingtième" being created. In 1754 the "vingtième" produced 11.7 million livres.

The taille was used very heavily by the French to fund their many wars like the Hundred Years' War and the Thirty Years' War. It eventually became one of the most hated taxes of the Ancien Régime.

== See also ==
- Tallage
