= National Guard (France) =

French military and police reserve force

- Garde nationale
- Logo of the National Guard (since 2016)
- Active: 1789–1827; 1831–1872; 2016–present
- Country: France
- Type: Reserve; Gendarmerie
- Size: >77,000
- Part of: French Armed Forces; National Police
- Mottos: Honneur et Patrie ('Honor and Fatherland')
- Engagements: French Revolutionary Wars; Napoleonic Wars; Greek War of Independence; Conquest of Algeria; Crimean War; Franco-Austrian War; Franco-Prussian War; Paris Commune; (List of wars involving France)
- Website: garde-nationale.gouv.fr (in French)

Commanders
- Minister of the Armed Forces: Catherine Vautrin
- Secretary General for the National Guard: Divisional General François-Xavier Poisbeau
- Deputy Secretary General for the National Guard: Brigadier General Karine Lejeune
- Notable commanders: Gilbert du Motier, Marquis de Lafayette

The National Guard (French: Garde nationale) is a French military, gendarmerie, and police reserve force, active in its current form since 2016 but originally founded in 1789 during the French Revolution. In 2016, France announced the reestablishment of the National Guard for the second time, in response to a series of terrorist attacks in the country.

It was founded as separate from the French Army and existed both for policing and as a military reserve. In its original stages from 1792 to 1795, the National Guard was perceived as revolutionary and the lower ranks were identified with the sans-culottes, or lower-class commoners. It experienced a period of official dissolution from 1827 to 1830 but was reestablished. Soon after the Franco-Prussian War of 1870–71, the National Guard in Paris again became viewed as dangerously revolutionary, which contributed to its dissolution in 1871.

== Creation ==
The raising of a "bourgeois guard" (French: garde bourgeoise) for Paris was discussed by the National Assembly on 11 July 1789 in response to the King's sudden and alarming replacement of the minister for finance and state, Jacques Necker, with the Baron de Breteuil on that day. The replacement caused rapidly spread anger and violence throughout Paris.

The National Assembly declared the formation of a "bourgeois militia" (French: milice bourgeoise) on 13 July. In the early morning of the next day, the search for weapons for this new militia led to the storming of the town hall, the Hotel des Invalides and then the storming of the Bastille.

Marquis de Lafayette was elected to the post of commander in chief of the Bourgeois Militia on 14 July, and it was renamed the "National Guard of Paris".

When the French Guards mutinied and were disbanded during the same month, the majority of this former royal regiment's rank and file became the full-time cadre of the Paris National Guard.

Similar bodies of National Guards were spontaneously created in the towns and rural districts of France in response to widespread fears of chaos or counter-revolution. "Bourgeois militia" changed its name to National Guard, like in Limoges in November 1789, where no other military bodies were allowed.

Initially, each city, town and village maintained National Guard units operated by their respective local governments in the districts for not more than a year. They were united on 14 July 1790 under Lafayette, who was appointed "Commandant General of all the National Guards of the Kingdom" and was responsible to the King as commander-in-chief of the armed forces.

=== Organization ===
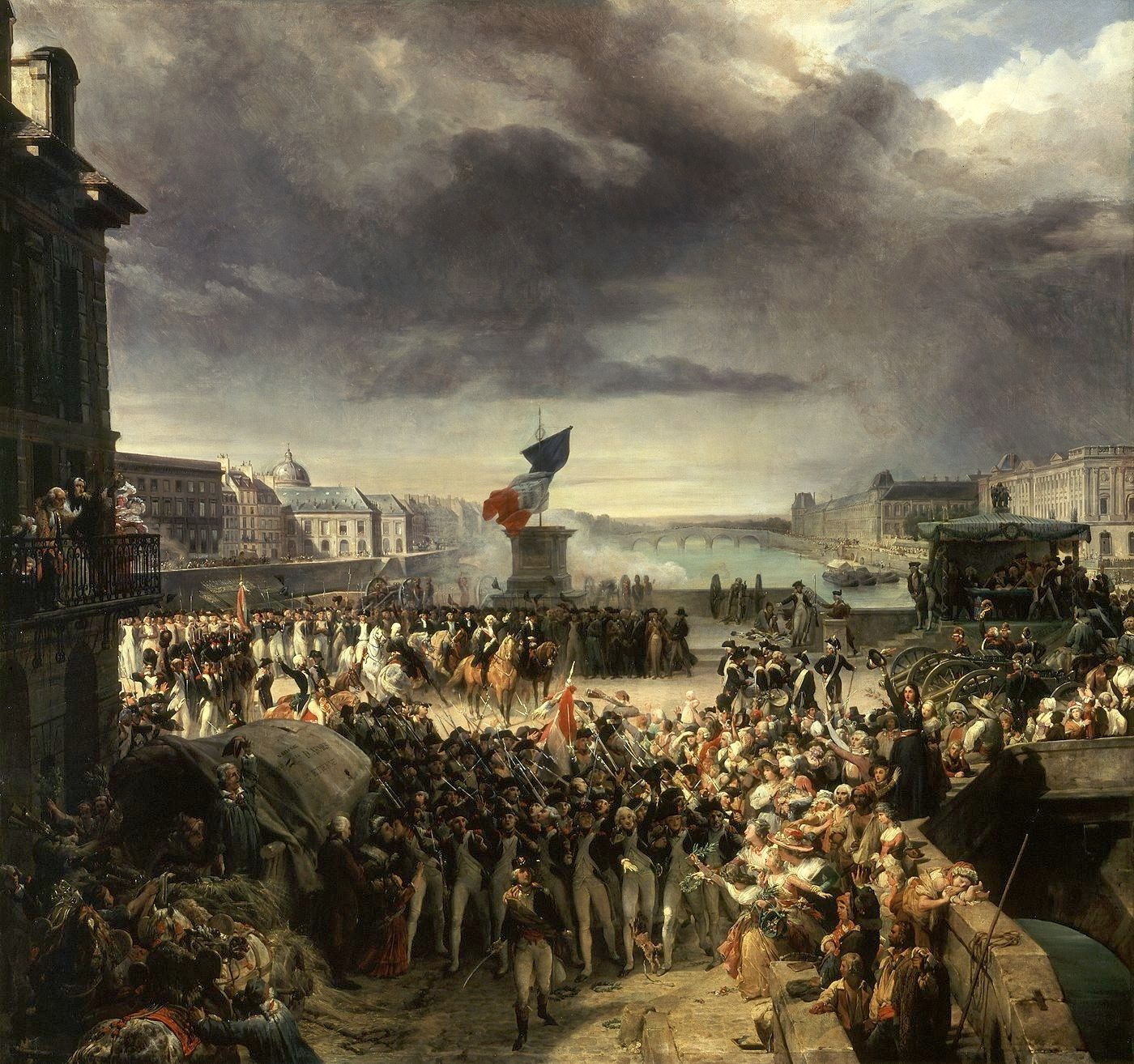
The National Guard of Paris Departs for the Army (Léon Cogniet, 1834)

On 5 December 1790, Robespierre held a speech on the urgent topic of the National Guard; envisaging an evolution from semi-organised militia to citizen-soldiers independent from the regular army. He repeated his ideas in the following year. On 18 December it was decreed to supply the National Guard with 50,000 fusils. In January 1791 Robespierre promoted the idea not only the National Guard but also the people had to be armed if necessary with pikes.

On 27 April 1791, Robespierre again opposed the plans for reorganizing the National Guard and restricting its membership to active citizens.

On 22 April and 15 June 1791, the Parliament recruited 400,000 National volunteers from the entire French National Guard. On 17 July 1791 Champ de Mars massacre took place. At the end of September a law passed to reorganize the National Guard formations in cantons and districts; each year officers and non-commissioned officers could be elected on 14 July.

Under the law of 14 October 1791, all active citizens and their children over 18 years were obliged to enlist in the National Guard. Their role was the maintenance of law and order and, if necessary, territorial defense in wartime.

Following a nationwide scheme decided on in September 1791, the National Guard was organised on the basis of district or canton companies. Five of these neighbourhood units (designated as fusiliers or grenadiers) made up a National Guard infantry battalion. Eight to ten battalions comprised a legion. Districts might also provide companies of veterans and young citizens, respectively drawn from volunteers over 60 or under 18. Where possible, there was provision for mounted detachments and artillery batteries under the Guard.

- The 23-years-old Napoleon Bonaparte began his "political career" as lieutenant-colonel of a Battalion of Corsican Volunteers in the National Guards (French: La Garde nationale des Volontaires corses) in February 1792.
- Chevalier de Saint-Georges was one of the first in Lille to join its Garde Nationale. (Note: St. Georges, private, 4th battalion, 2nd company, 1st platoon, 2nd squad, No. 8)

On 2 July 1792, the Assembly authorized the National Guard's attendance as part of the Festival of Federation on 14 July, thus circumventing a royal veto. Section assemblies were permitting "passive" citizens to join their National Guard companies without seeking formal permission.

On 11 July, the Jacobins won an emergency vote in the wavering Assembly, declaring the nation in danger and drafting all Parisians with pikes or pistols into the National Guard. On 17 July the municipality of Paris accepted all citizens armed with a pike for enlistment as part of the capital's own National Guard unit.

The citizens kept their weapons and their uniforms at home and set forth with them when required. The initially multi-coloured uniforms of the various provincial National Guard units were standardised in 1791, using as a model the dark blue coats with red collars, white lapels and cuffs worn by the Paris National Guard since its creation. This combination of colours matched those of the then young revolutionary tricolour flag. The uniform headdress was the tricorne.

== From French Revolution until 1827 ==
=== Role during the Revolution ===
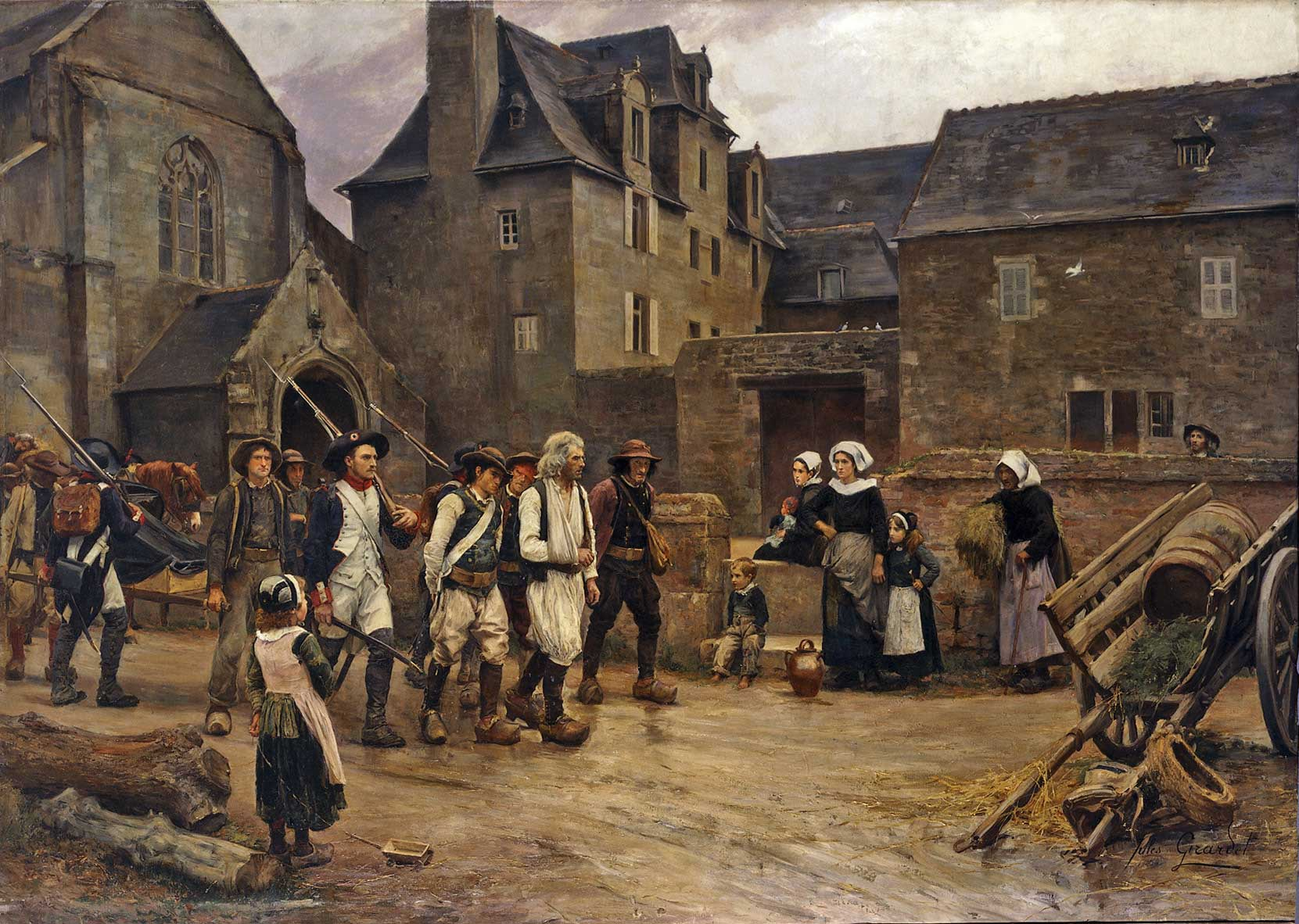
Soldiers of the Quimper National Guard escorting royalist rebels in Brittany (1792). Painting by Jules Girardet.

The formation of the National Guard can be seen as a response to public demand for maintaining order, while at the same time reducing or ending its dependence on the monarchy. The former Guet royal had held responsibility for the maintenance of law and order in Paris from 1254 to 1791, when the National Guard took over this role.

In fact, the last commander of the Guet royal (French: Chevalier du Guet), de La Rothière, was elected to head the National Guard in 1791. In the summer of 1792, the fundamental character of the guard changed. The fédérés were admitted to the guard and the subsequent takeover of the guard by Antoine Joseph Santerre when Mandat was murdered in the first hours of the insurrection of 10 August placed a radical revolutionary at the head of the Guard.

After the abolition of the monarchy (21 September 1792), the National Guard fought for the Revolution and it had an important role in forcing the wishes of the capital on the French National Assembly which was obliged to give way in front of the force of the "patriotic" bayonets. The Insurrection of 31 May started after François Henriot was chosen by the Commune to lead the Paris Guards.

After 9 Thermidor, year II (27 July 1794), the new government of the Thermidorian Reaction placed the National Guard under the control of more conservative leadership. Part of the National Guard then attempted to overthrow the Directory during the royalist insurrection on the 13 Vendémiaire, year IV (5 October 1795), but was defeated by forces led by Napoleon Bonaparte in the Battle of 13 Vendémiaire. The Paris National Guard thereafter ceased to play a significant political role.

=== First Empire ===
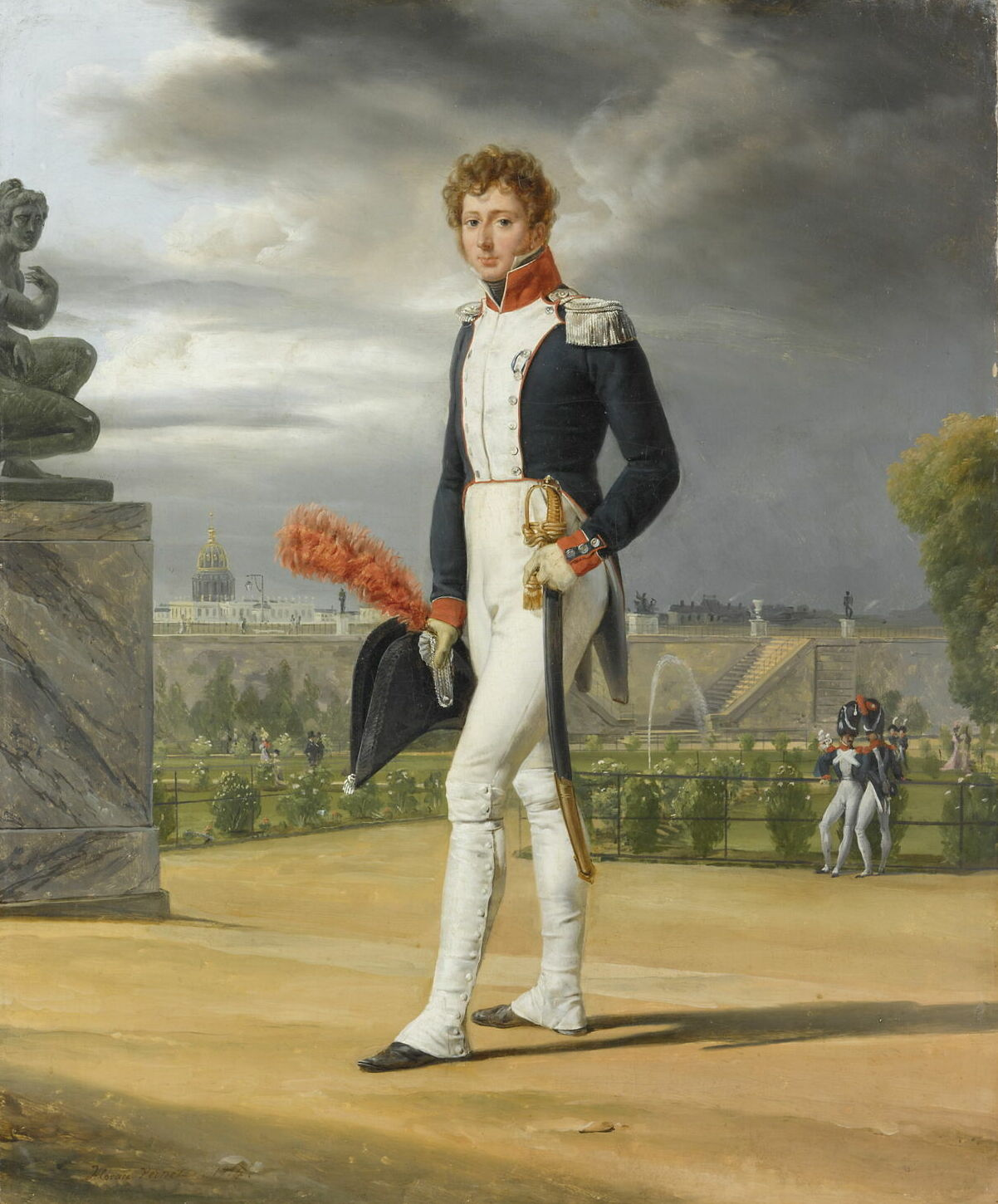
Philippe Lenoir, (1785–1867), French painter, in his National Guard uniform. By Horace Vernet (1789–1863)

Napoleon did not believe that the middle-class National Guard would be able to maintain order and suppress riots. Therefore, he created a Municipal Guard of Paris, a full-time gendarmerie which was strongly militarized. However, he did not abolish the National Guard but was content to partially disarm it. He kept the force in reserve and mobilised it for the defence of French territory in 1809 and 1814.

In Paris during this period the National Guard comprised twelve thousand bourgeois property owners, serving part-time and equipped at their own expense, whose prime function was to guard public buildings on a roster basis.

Between 1811 and 1812 the National Guard was organized in "cohorts" to distinguish it from the regular army, and for home defence only. By a skilful appeal to patriotism, and judicious pressure applied through the prefects, it became a useful reservoir of half-trained men for new battalions of the active army.

After the disastrous campaign in Russia in 1812, dozens of National Guard cohorts were called up for field duty the next year; four cohorts being combined to form one line infantry regiment. The 135ème to 156ème Régiments d'Infanterie de Ligne were thus formed. Many of these fought in the campaigns in Germany in 1813 and the invasion of north-east France by Coalition forces in 1814. Existing National Guard units, such as those of Paris, were deployed as defence corps in their areas of recruitment.

Mass conscription was extended to age groups previously exempt from military service, to provide more manpower for the expanded National Guard. Students and volunteers from gamekeepers and other professional groups formed separate units within the National Guard. Clothing and equipment were often in short supply and even the Paris National Guard was obliged to provide pikes as substitute weapons for some of its new recruits. These field and regional units were disbanded in 1814 after the abdication of Napoleon I.

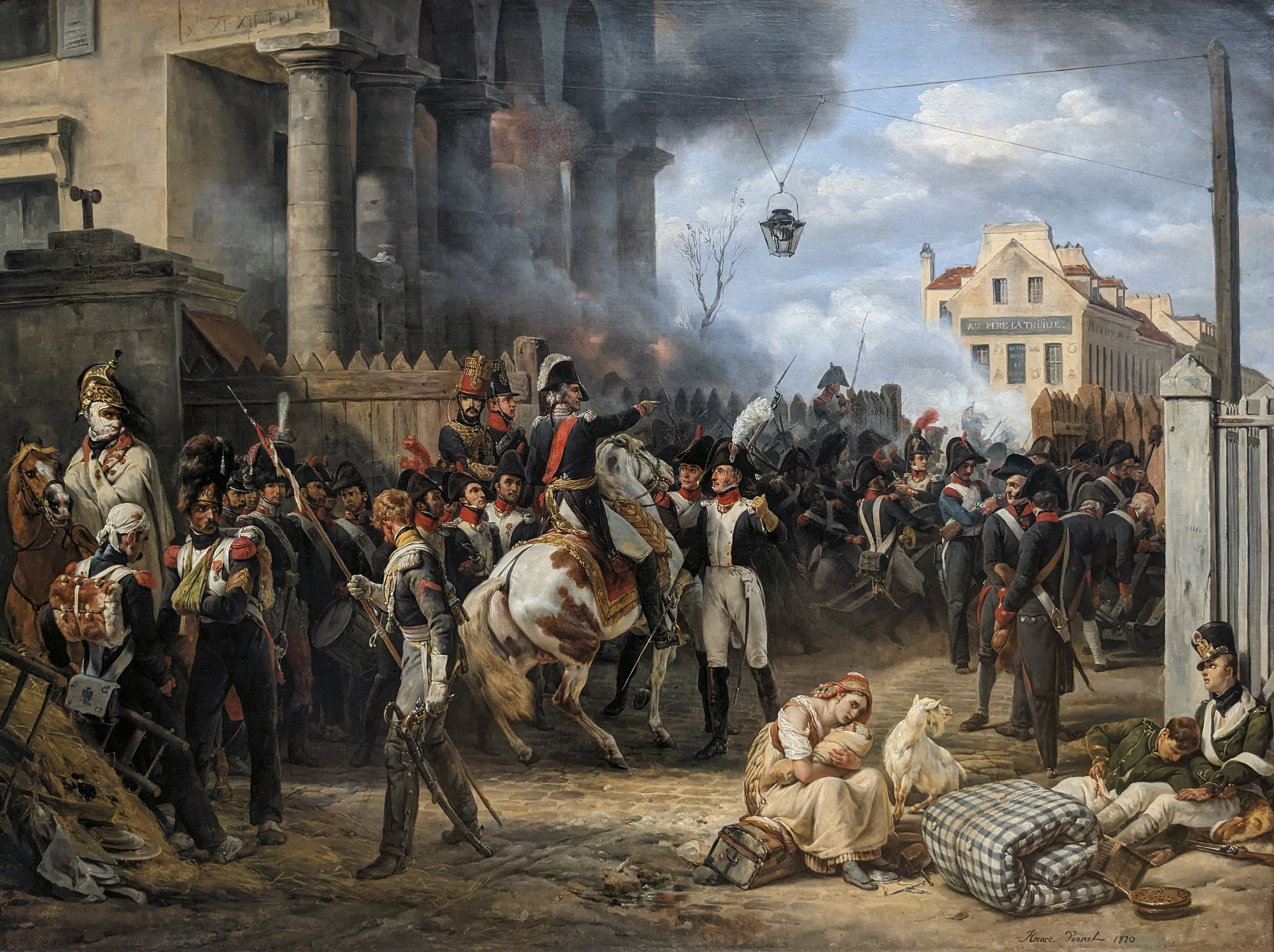
The National Guard at the Battle of Paris in 1814

Six thousand national guardsmen took part in the Battle of Paris in 1814. Following the occupation of Paris by the allied armies, the National Guard was expanded to 35,000 men and became the primary force for maintaining order within the city.

=== The Restoration ===
Under the Restoration in 1814, the National Guard was maintained by Louis XVIII.

Initially, the Guard, purged of its Napoleonic leadership, maintained good relations with the restored monarchy. The future Charles X served as its Colonel-General, reviewed the force regularly and intervened to veto its proposed disbandment on the grounds of economy by the Conseil.

However, by 1827, the middle-class men who still composed the Guard had come to feel a degree of hostility towards the reactionary monarchy. Following hostile cries, at a review on 29 April Charles X dissolved the Guard the following day, on the grounds of offensive behaviour towards the crown. He neglected to disarm the disbanded force, and its muskets resurfaced in 1830 during the July Revolution.

== National Guard from 1831 to 1872 ==
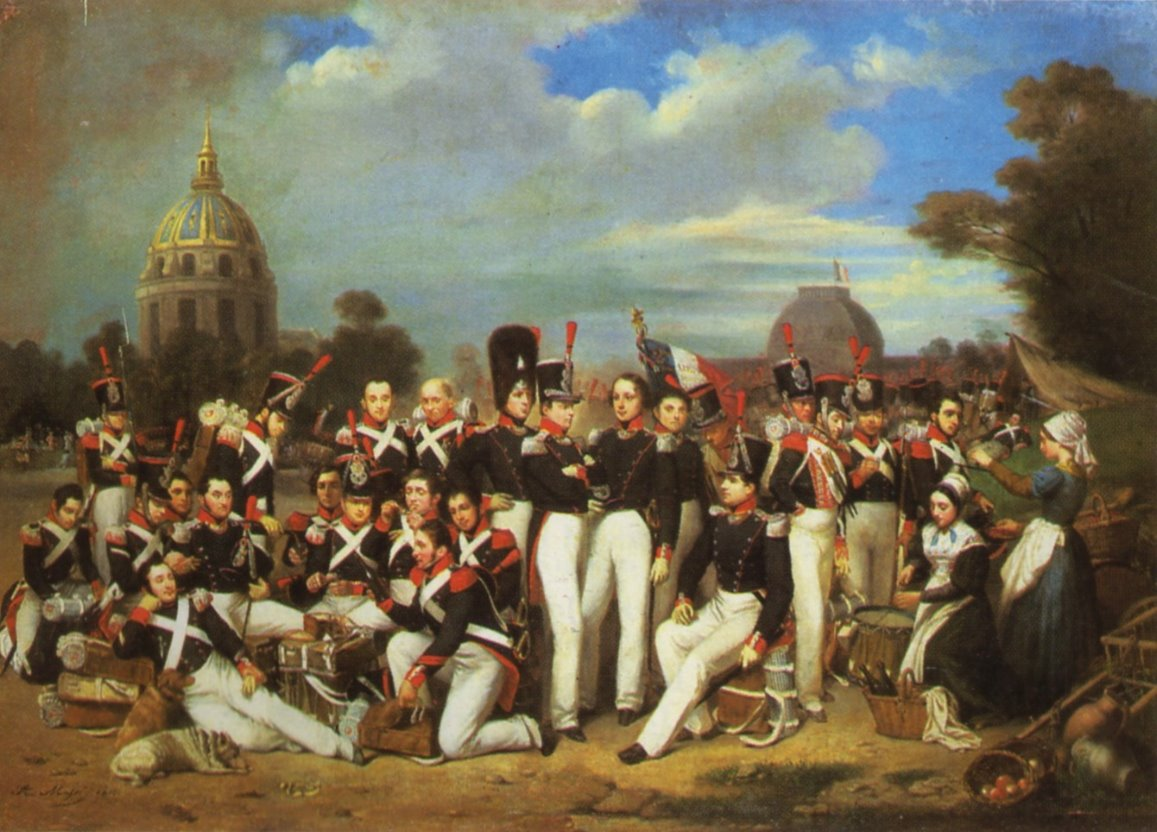
A company of the 2nd Legion of the National Guard on the Champs de Mars in Paris (1836)

A new National Guard was established in 1831 following the July Revolution in 1830. It played a major role in suppressing the Paris June Rebellion of 1832 against the government of King Louis Phillipe I.

However, the same National Guard fought in the Revolution of 1848 in favour of the republicans. This change in allegiance reflected a general erosion in the popularity of Louis-Phillipe and his "Bourgeois Monarchy", rather than any fundamental change in the make-up of the National Guard, which remained a middle-class body.

=== Second Empire ===
Napoleon III confined the National Guard during the Second Empire to subordinate tasks to reduce its liberal and republican influence. During the Franco-Prussian War the Government of National Defense of 1870 called on the Guard to undertake a major role in defending Paris against the invading Prussian army.

During the uprising of the Paris Commune, from March to May 1871, the National Guard in Paris was expanded to include all able-bodied citizens capable of carrying weapons.

Following the Commune's defeat by the regular French Army, the National Guard was officially abolished and its units disbanded. Also disbanded was the Mobile National Guard (French: Garde Nationale Mobile) raised in 1866 to provide personnel and officers for rapid deployment operations nationwide, as well as to provide reserve personnel for the armed forces.

=== End of the National Guard (1872) ===
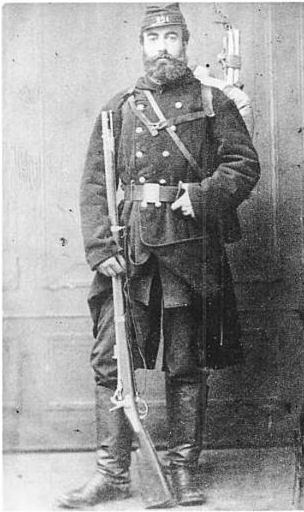
French Garde Nationale soldier with Tabatière rifle, 1870

Despite its major role in the Franco-Prussian War, the National Guard was disbanded soon after the establishment of the Third Republic.

Having been converted from a volunteer reserve into a much larger force composed mainly of conscripts, the National Guard had lost its identity and raison d'être. It also faced opposition from the regular army which was opposed to such a large armed force outside its direct control.

The role of the Paris units of the National Guard in the uprising of the Paris Commune led to a great degree of hostility towards the National Guard, especially from the army.

Perceived as an embodiment of the revolutionary republican "nation in arms" at the time of the Revolution of 1789, the National Guard was formally disbanded on 14 March 1872 as a threat to the security and order of the new Third Republic.

The National Guard was superseded by the creation of territorial regiments, made up of older men who had completed their period of full-time military service. These reserve units were embodied only in times of general mobilisation but remained an integral part of the regular army, distinguished only by details of insignia.

== Resurrection (2016–present) ==
After several terror attacks in France, which intensified in 2014–15, French President François Hollande declared the establishment of a new third National Guard. By his words, the Guard would be formed using military reserve forces.

On 12 October 2016, during a weekly meeting of the Cabinet, the National Guard was officially reconstituted after 145 years, as the fifth service branch of the French Armed Forces under the Ministry of the Armed Forces. The revitalized Guard would also reinforce elements of the National Gendarmerie and the National Police in securing major events nationwide while it would perform its historical responsibility as a national military and police reserve service.

It was expected that the new Guard would grow to a 72,500-member force in 2017 and grow to an 86,000-member national reserve in 2018. The formation of the revived Guard would be assisted with a dedicated 311-million euro budget and its personnel come from the reserves, members from the private sector and active personnel seconded to the service. Unlike the Guard of the Revolutionary Wars, its officers are now seconded from both the Army and the National Gendarmerie and are graduates of their respective academies.

As of 2024, Division General François-Xavier Poisbeau serves as the Secretary-General for the National Guard, who reports to the Chief of Defence Staff and the Minister of the Armed Forces.
