= Pays d'élection =

Type of administrative division in the Ancien Régime

In white, the pays d'élections in 1789

A pays d'élection (French pronunciation: [pɛi delɛksjɔ̃]) was one of the three types of généralité, or fiscal administrative region, in France under the Ancien Régime. The representative of the royal government, the intendant, managed the taxes in each region with the aid of the élus, who managed the subdivisions of the élections at a local level. They were for a long time elected by the States General, hence the name of their office and of the pays d'élection. From 1614 to 1789, however, the States General did not meet, and instead the King named the intendants and the élus. This was in contrast to the pays d'état, such as Brittany or Burgundy, where fiscal policy was regulated by local rules and benefited from a certain autonomy; and to the pays d'imposition, where policy was decided directly by the king. The pays d'imposition were the territories annexed under the reign of Louis XIV, such as Franche-Comté.

In 1787, Chief Minister Loménie de Brienne reformed the French tax administration by creating the assemblées provinciales in a number of the pays d'élection, which had control over their own tax policies, thus bringing these provinces closer to the pays d'état in their administrative system. This reform did not last, however, as in 1790 the National Constituent Assembly established a different system: that of the départements.

== History ==
=== Origin under John II and Charles V ===
The position of the élus was established in 1355 under the reign of John II. They were charged by the States General to raise the war subsidy in all the dioceses of the kingdom, in December 1355 and March 1356. However, the élus were only temporary commissioners until John's successor, Charles V, made them permanent royal officers. In 1372, the position was officially established as the collectors of the taille and the aides (indirect duty taxes), as well as judges in courts of first instances in cases concerning taxes. The élus exercised their functions in the dioceses until specific divisions called élections were created c.1380, corresponding approximately to the borders of the dioceses, although not exactly. The word "élections" first appeared as administrative nomenclature in 1452.

=== The pays d'élection from 1500 to 1789 ===
The system of the élections underwent constant change throughout the duration of the Ancien Régime. The élection of Bellac, for example, was abolished and re-established three times between 1558 and 1597. Throughout the 16th century, their number increased considerably: beginning at 92, it would be 109 in the early days of Henry III's reign in 1575, and Henry IV's reign would see it rise further, reaching 146 by 1597. Richelieu, First Minister of Louis XIII, tampered with the system further during the 17th century when he attempted to transform certain pays d'état into pays d'élection by establishing élus there. He succeeded in Dauphiné, which became a pays d'élection in 1628, but failed in Languedoc, Burgundy, and Provence.

On the advent of the revolution in 1789, there were 186 élections across various généralités.

=== Decline and abolition ===
Following the creation of a bureau des finances in each généralité in 1577, the élus fell under the control of the trésoriers généraux, the officers who managed it. During the 17th century, the power of the élus gradually slipped into the hands of the intendants. Placed at the head of a généralité, these new agents of the monarchy mostly deprived the élus of their powers as officers as early as 1642.

The beginning of the end for the pays d'élection came with the king's edict of June 1787, which established the assemblées provinciales in all the provinces without states provincial (i.e., not the pays d'état). This was an expansion to all the pays d'élections of the system which had for a while been in place in Haute-Guyenne and Berry, and granted a level of autonomy in determining taxation similar to that held by the pays d'état.

The pays d'élection, along with the other généralités, were officially abolished on 4 March 1790 by the National Assembly. They were replaced by the new 83 départements.
