= Maltôte =

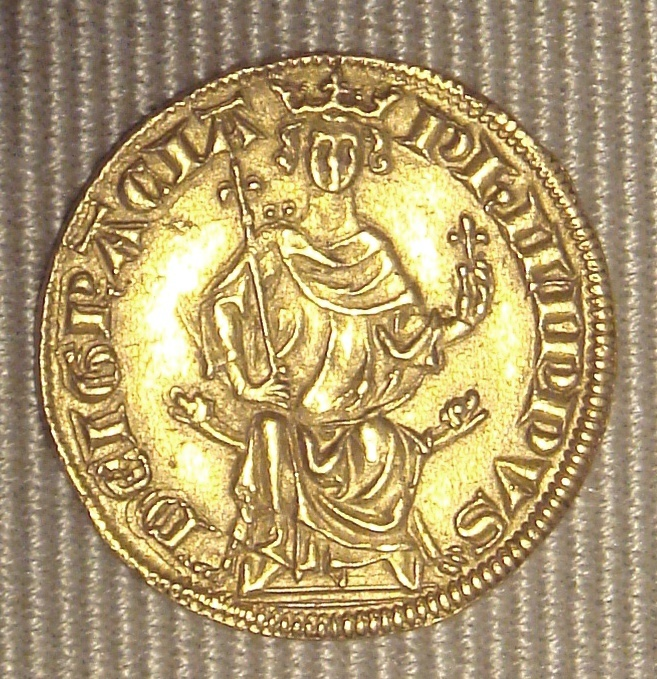
A coin of Philip IV the Fair

In medieval French law, a maltôte is an extraordinary tax that applied to everyday consumer goods (wine, beer, wax ...), raised to cope with unusual expenses. In general, it was to finance the cost of wars or fortification works.

== Origin ==
The term "malatolta" was used for it from the 10th century. The first mention of the term "maltôte" seems to be in the registre des olim in 1273

Philip the Fair made himself unpopular by raising maltôte in 1292 to finance the Flanders War: the tax of the denier per pound was payable by both the seller and the purchaser. Because of its unpopular character it was quickly named by the people by the pejorative name of "maltôte". The maltôte was, indeed, frequently badly perceived by the populations who were put at contribution for purposes sometimes very far from their daily concerns. The war in Flanders was thus at the origin of a popular revolt in Rouen, which aimed to oppose the maltôte. As a matter of fact, the maltôte was a tax between 0.33 (Paris) and 0.50% (Tours). By extension, the word "maltôte" quickly was used to mean any extraordinary taxes. The use of maltôtes lasted until the eighteenth century.

== Etymology ==
- "Maltôte" could come from:
  1. "mala tolta", from Latin malus ("bad") and tollere ("to take away, take, despoil)": "bad tax".
  2. "mal toste", which would mean "bad greeting", in the sense of "I do not give you hello".

The French word "maltôtiers" has been applied to officers or other persons engaged in the collection of taxes, and by extension, to those who demand rights which are not due.

== See also ==
- Gabelle
- Taille
