= Estates of Languedoc =

Languedoc Coat of Arms

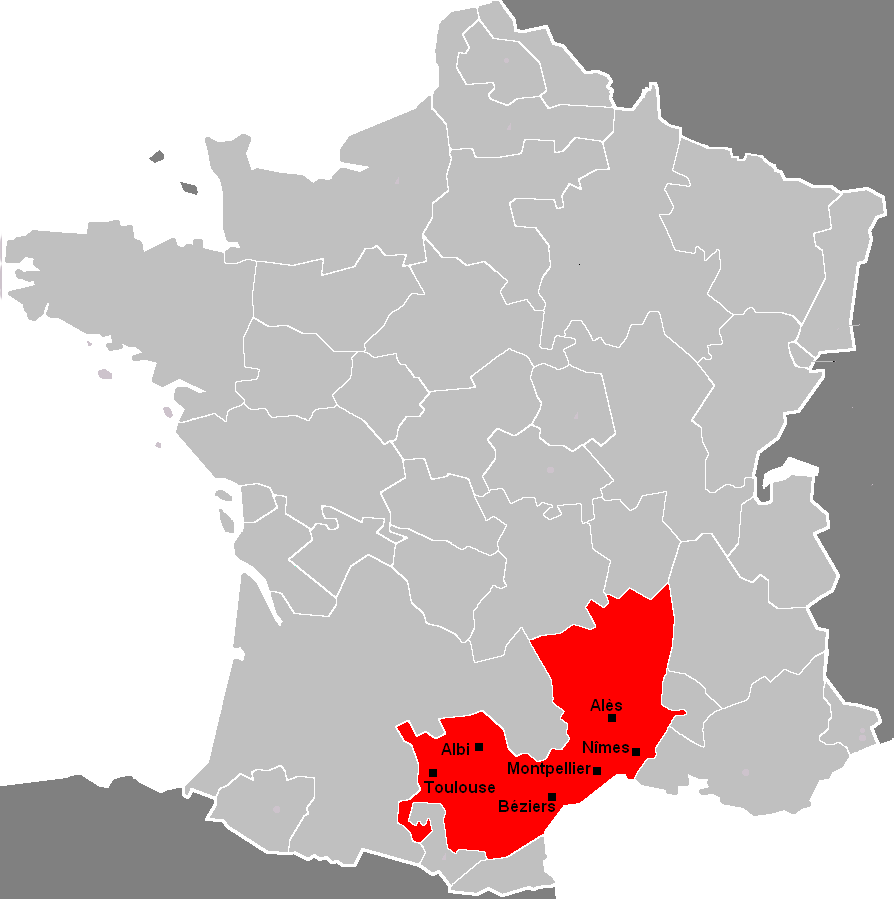
The Province of Languedoc (Pre-Revolution)

The Estates of Languedoc was the provincial assembly for the province of Languedoc during the ancien regime, during which time it was a pays d'états.
