= Généralité =

Recettes générales, commonly known as généralités (French pronunciation: [ʒeneʁalite]), were the administrative divisions of France under the Ancien Régime and are often considered to prefigure the current préfectures. At the time of the French Revolution, there were 36 généralités.

Among the multiple divisions utilised for various purposes by the kings' administrators, généralités emerged gradually from the 14th to the 16th centuries. Initially fiscal, their role steadily increased to become by the late 17th century — under the authority of an intendant (reporting to the Controller-General of Finances) — the very framework of royal administration and centralisation.

== History ==
Before the 14th century, oversight of the collection of royal taxes fell generally to the baillis and sénéchaux in their circumscriptions. Reforms in the 14th and 15th centuries saw France's royal financial administration run by two financial boards which worked in a collegial manner: the four généraux des finances (also called général conseiller or receveur général ) oversaw the collection of taxes (taille, aides, gabelle, etc.) and the four trésoriers de France (treasurers) oversaw revenues from royal lands (the domaine royal). Together they were often referred to as messieurs des finances. The four members of each board were divided by geographical circumscriptions (although the term généralité is not found before the end of the 15th century); the areas were named Languedoïl (center and southwest of the country), Languedoc (Languedoc, Lyonnais, Forez, Beaujolais), Outre-Seine-et-Yonne (Île-de-France, Champagne), and Normandy (the latter was created in 1449; the other three were created earlier), with the directors of the Languedoïl region typically having an honorific preeminence. By 1484, the number of généralités had increased to six.

In the 16th century, the kings of France, in an effort to exert a more direct control over royal finances and to circumvent the double-board (accused of poor oversight), instituted numerous administrative reforms, including the restructuring of the financial administration and an increase in the number of généralités. On December 7, 1542, by edict of Francis I, France was divided into sixteen généralités. The number increased to twenty-one at the end of the 16th century, and to thirty-six by the time of the French Revolution. The last two were created in 1784.

The administration of the généralités of the early modern period went through a variety of reforms. In 1577 Henry III established five treasurers (trésoriers généraux) in each généralité who would form a bureau of finances. In the 17th century, oversight of the généralités was subsumed by the "intendants of finance, justice and police", and the expression généralité and intendance became roughly synonymous.

== List of Généralités - Intendances ==
The 36 Généralités of France in 1789. Areas in red are "pays d'état"; white "pays d'élection"; yellow "pays d'imposition"

Généralité	Year of creation	Provinces
1. Généralité of Bordeaux, (Agen)	(1542)	Guyenne
2. Généralité of Provence, or Aix-en-Provence	(1542)	Provence
3. Généralité of Amiens	(1542)	Picardy
4. Généralité of Bourges	(1542)	Berry
5. Généralité of Caen	(1542)	Normandy
6. Généralité of Châlons	(1542)	Champagne
7. Généralité of Burgundy, Dijon	(1542)	Burgundy
8. Généralité of Grenoble	(1542)	Dauphiné
9. Généralité of Issoire later of Riom	(1542)	Auvergne
10. Généralité of Lyon	(1542)	Lyonnais, Beaujolais and Forez
11. Généralité of Montpellier	(1542)	Languedoc
12. Généralité of Paris	(1542)	Île-de-France
13. Généralité of Poitiers	(1542)	Poitou
14. Généralité of Rouen	(1542)	Normandy
15. Généralité of Toulouse	(1542)	Languedoc
16. Généralité of Tours	(1542)	Touraine, Maine and Anjou
17. Généralité of Metz	(1552)	Trois-Évêchés
18. Généralité of Nantes	(1552)	Brittany
19. Généralité of Limoges	(1558)	Limousin, Marche and Angoumois
20. Généralité of Orléans	(1558)	Orléanais
21. Généralité of Moulins	(1587)	Bourbonnais
22. Généralité of Soissons	(1595)	Picardy
23. Généralité of Montauban	(1635)	Gascony
24. Généralité of Alençon	(1636)	Perche
25. Généralité of Perpignan	(1660)	Roussillon
26. Généralité of Besançon	(1676)	Franche-Comté
27. Généralité of Valenciennes	(1678)	Hainaut
28. Généralité of Strasbourg	(1689)	Alsace
29. (see 18)
30. Généralité of Lille	(1691)	Flanders
31. Généralité of La Rochelle	(1694)	Aunis and Saintonge
32. Généralité of Nancy	(1737)	Lorraine
33. Généralité of Trévoux	(1762)	Dombes
34. Généralité of Corsica, or of Bastia	(1768)	Corsica
35. Généralité of Auch	(1776)	Gascony
36. Généralité of Bayonne	(1784)	Labourd
37. Généralité of Pau	(1784)	Béarn and Soule

== See also ==
- Ancien Régime in France
- Provinces of France
- Taille
