= Royal Watch =

Historic French police unit

The Royal Watch, in French guet royal, was a French police unit founded in December 1254 by King Louis IX. It was officially merged with the "Lieutenancy General of Police" in 1750, to form the Paris Guard. The name "Royal Watch" was still used unofficially by the Paris Guard until the French Revolution, when many members of the Paris Guard joined the new National Guard.

The Royal Watch were also known to Parisians as "the archers".

== History ==
Louis IX founded the Watch in 1254 at the request of the guilds of Paris. Its mission was "for the safety of their persons and goods, to remedy the evils that occurred every night in the town, by fire, theft, burglary, violence, rape, and the removal of furniture".

Originally, the Royal Watch cooperated with the Standing Watch (guet assis, literally 'sitting watch') provided by the townspeople of Paris (composed of the Burghers' Watch, guet bourgeois, and Guild Watch, guet des métiers). These watches came under the commander of the Royal Watch, titled the Knight of the Watch (chevalier du guet), who was answerable to the Provost.

In 1364, the Knight of the Watch's forces by day were 12 sergeants. By night, he commanded eight standing posts of six watchmen each, and patrols conducted by twelve horse sergeants and twenty foot sergeants, as well as two "watch clerks" (clercs de guet).

In 1559, the Burghers' Watch and Guild Watch, considered ineffective, were dissolved. Increasingly exemptions had been sought from the burden of performing one full night's patrol duty every three weeks until the age of sixty. Instead, the Royal Watch received 200 archers, of whom 32 were on horse. By 1563 this had increased to 300 archers on foot and 200 on horse.

From 1667, the Royal Watch operated alongside the Lieutenancy General of Police founded by Gabriel Nicolas de La Reynie. In 1750 the Lieutenancy General and Royal Watch merged to form the Paris Guard.
