= States provincial (France) =

Assembly of a province in ancien régime France

The pays d'etat (red) of ancien regime France (the pays d'imposition in yellow)

In France under the ancien régime, a states (or estates) provincial (états provinciaux [eta pʁɔvɛ̃sjo]) or estates particular (états particuliers [eta paʁtikylje]) (to distinguish them from the Estates General; but see § États particuliers below) was an assembly of the three estates of a province, "regularly constituted, periodically convoked and possessing certain political and administrative functions, of which the main one was to vote on the impôt". Only the pays d'état had rights to such estates.

== A right reserved to the pays d'état ==
This arose from the specific legal conditions of their historical incorporation into the royal domain (e.g., Burgundy, Foix, Languedoc) or into France itself (e.g., Béarn, Corsica, Dauphiné). In contrast to the pays d'état, any area where impôts were fixed by the king's representatives (known as the élus) were known as pays d'élection. This distinction was abolished during the French Revolution in 1789. A third category, "pays d'imposition" was used for recently conquered lands which had their own local institutions (they were similar to the "pays d'état" under which they are sometimes grouped), although taxation was overseen by the royal intendant.

== États particuliers ==
While états provinciaux and états particuliers were mostly used interchangeably, in some pays d'état, the term états particuliers was reserved to the estates of regions within these provinces. For example, in Burgundy the counties (comtés) of Auxerre, Bar-sur-Seine, Charolais and the Mâconnais each had their own états particuliers in the early modern period. These would send representatives to the Burgundian états provinciaux in Dijon. Only the Mâconnais retained its own états in 1789; the rest had been absorbed into the Burgundian estates general. The impôts were the provincial estates' main preoccupation and raison d'être throughout the ancien régime. Their formal assent to the impôts was generally accompanied by the drafting of complaints to send to the king or his councils.

== List of states-provincial and -particular in 1789 ==
- Estates of Artois
- Estates of Béarn
- Estates of Bigorre
- Estates of Bresse
- Estates of Brittany
- Estates of Bugey
- Estates of Burgundy
- Estates of Cambrésis
- Estates of Charolais
- Estates of Corsica
- Estates of Dauphiné
- Estates of Flanders
- Estates of Foix
- Estates of Gévaudan
- Estates of Hainaut
- Estates of Labourd
- Estates of Languedoc
- Estates of Marsan
- Estates of Navarre
- Estates of Nébouzan
- Estates of Provence
- Estates of Quatre-Vallées
- Estates of Soule
- Estates of Velay
- Estates of Vivarais
