= Pays d'imposition =

Type of administrative division in the Ancien Régime

In yellow, the pays d'imposition in 1789

A pays d'imposition was one of the three types of généralité, or fiscal administrative region, in France under the Ancien Régime. They were territories conquered by the French Bourbon kings, who imposed heavy taxes on them even before establishing a political structure. To prevent these newly acquired territories from rebelling, the French king decided to stifle them by denying them the option of maintaining their own financial or other institutions.
